

389001–389100 

|-bgcolor=#fefefe
| 389001 ||  || — || October 23, 2008 || Kitt Peak || Spacewatch || — || align=right | 1.0 km || 
|-id=002 bgcolor=#E9E9E9
| 389002 ||  || — || October 23, 2008 || Kitt Peak || Spacewatch || — || align=right | 1.4 km || 
|-id=003 bgcolor=#fefefe
| 389003 ||  || — || March 20, 2007 || Kitt Peak || Spacewatch || — || align=right data-sort-value="0.90" | 900 m || 
|-id=004 bgcolor=#E9E9E9
| 389004 ||  || — || October 24, 2008 || Kitt Peak || Spacewatch || — || align=right data-sort-value="0.78" | 780 m || 
|-id=005 bgcolor=#E9E9E9
| 389005 ||  || — || October 24, 2008 || Kitt Peak || Spacewatch || — || align=right | 1.3 km || 
|-id=006 bgcolor=#fefefe
| 389006 ||  || — || October 24, 2008 || Kitt Peak || Spacewatch || — || align=right | 2.0 km || 
|-id=007 bgcolor=#E9E9E9
| 389007 ||  || — || October 24, 2008 || Mount Lemmon || Mount Lemmon Survey || — || align=right | 1.8 km || 
|-id=008 bgcolor=#E9E9E9
| 389008 ||  || — || October 24, 2008 || Mount Lemmon || Mount Lemmon Survey || — || align=right | 1.00 km || 
|-id=009 bgcolor=#E9E9E9
| 389009 ||  || — || October 9, 2008 || Kitt Peak || Spacewatch || — || align=right | 1.2 km || 
|-id=010 bgcolor=#E9E9E9
| 389010 ||  || — || October 24, 2008 || Kitt Peak || Spacewatch || — || align=right | 1.5 km || 
|-id=011 bgcolor=#E9E9E9
| 389011 ||  || — || October 24, 2008 || Kitt Peak || Spacewatch || — || align=right | 1.2 km || 
|-id=012 bgcolor=#E9E9E9
| 389012 ||  || — || October 25, 2008 || Mount Lemmon || Mount Lemmon Survey || — || align=right | 1.7 km || 
|-id=013 bgcolor=#E9E9E9
| 389013 ||  || — || October 22, 2008 || Kitt Peak || Spacewatch || — || align=right | 1.3 km || 
|-id=014 bgcolor=#E9E9E9
| 389014 ||  || — || September 25, 2008 || Kitt Peak || Spacewatch || EUN || align=right | 1.3 km || 
|-id=015 bgcolor=#fefefe
| 389015 ||  || — || October 23, 2008 || Kitt Peak || Spacewatch || V || align=right data-sort-value="0.87" | 870 m || 
|-id=016 bgcolor=#E9E9E9
| 389016 ||  || — || October 24, 2008 || Kitt Peak || Spacewatch || — || align=right data-sort-value="0.85" | 850 m || 
|-id=017 bgcolor=#E9E9E9
| 389017 ||  || — || October 25, 2008 || Kitt Peak || Spacewatch || JUN || align=right | 1.1 km || 
|-id=018 bgcolor=#E9E9E9
| 389018 ||  || — || October 25, 2008 || Mount Lemmon || Mount Lemmon Survey || — || align=right | 1.1 km || 
|-id=019 bgcolor=#E9E9E9
| 389019 ||  || — || October 25, 2008 || Catalina || CSS || ADE || align=right | 3.4 km || 
|-id=020 bgcolor=#E9E9E9
| 389020 ||  || — || October 21, 2008 || Kitt Peak || Spacewatch || — || align=right | 1.8 km || 
|-id=021 bgcolor=#E9E9E9
| 389021 ||  || — || September 28, 2008 || Mount Lemmon || Mount Lemmon Survey || — || align=right | 1.3 km || 
|-id=022 bgcolor=#E9E9E9
| 389022 ||  || — || October 26, 2008 || Mount Lemmon || Mount Lemmon Survey || — || align=right | 1.4 km || 
|-id=023 bgcolor=#E9E9E9
| 389023 ||  || — || October 27, 2008 || Kitt Peak || Spacewatch || — || align=right | 1.4 km || 
|-id=024 bgcolor=#E9E9E9
| 389024 ||  || — || October 28, 2008 || Kitt Peak || Spacewatch || — || align=right data-sort-value="0.91" | 910 m || 
|-id=025 bgcolor=#d6d6d6
| 389025 ||  || — || October 28, 2008 || Kitt Peak || Spacewatch || — || align=right | 2.0 km || 
|-id=026 bgcolor=#E9E9E9
| 389026 ||  || — || October 30, 2008 || Kitt Peak || Spacewatch || — || align=right | 1.2 km || 
|-id=027 bgcolor=#E9E9E9
| 389027 ||  || — || October 31, 2008 || Mount Lemmon || Mount Lemmon Survey || BRG || align=right | 1.5 km || 
|-id=028 bgcolor=#E9E9E9
| 389028 ||  || — || September 24, 2008 || Kitt Peak || Spacewatch || — || align=right | 1.1 km || 
|-id=029 bgcolor=#E9E9E9
| 389029 ||  || — || October 8, 2008 || Mount Lemmon || Mount Lemmon Survey || — || align=right | 1.1 km || 
|-id=030 bgcolor=#E9E9E9
| 389030 ||  || — || October 31, 2008 || Mount Lemmon || Mount Lemmon Survey || RAF || align=right data-sort-value="0.84" | 840 m || 
|-id=031 bgcolor=#E9E9E9
| 389031 ||  || — || October 31, 2008 || Catalina || CSS || JUN || align=right | 1.2 km || 
|-id=032 bgcolor=#E9E9E9
| 389032 ||  || — || October 31, 2008 || Kitt Peak || Spacewatch || — || align=right | 1.2 km || 
|-id=033 bgcolor=#E9E9E9
| 389033 ||  || — || October 30, 2008 || Kitt Peak || Spacewatch || — || align=right | 1.4 km || 
|-id=034 bgcolor=#E9E9E9
| 389034 ||  || — || October 26, 2008 || Kitt Peak || Spacewatch || — || align=right | 1.1 km || 
|-id=035 bgcolor=#E9E9E9
| 389035 ||  || — || October 27, 2008 || Mount Lemmon || Mount Lemmon Survey || — || align=right | 1.1 km || 
|-id=036 bgcolor=#E9E9E9
| 389036 ||  || — || October 21, 2008 || Mount Lemmon || Mount Lemmon Survey || — || align=right | 1.1 km || 
|-id=037 bgcolor=#E9E9E9
| 389037 ||  || — || October 24, 2008 || Catalina || CSS || — || align=right | 1.3 km || 
|-id=038 bgcolor=#E9E9E9
| 389038 ||  || — || October 26, 2008 || Mount Lemmon || Mount Lemmon Survey || — || align=right | 1.2 km || 
|-id=039 bgcolor=#E9E9E9
| 389039 ||  || — || October 28, 2008 || Kitt Peak || Spacewatch || — || align=right | 1.0 km || 
|-id=040 bgcolor=#E9E9E9
| 389040 ||  || — || October 29, 2008 || Kitt Peak || Spacewatch || — || align=right | 1.2 km || 
|-id=041 bgcolor=#E9E9E9
| 389041 ||  || — || October 26, 2008 || Catalina || CSS || — || align=right | 1.0 km || 
|-id=042 bgcolor=#E9E9E9
| 389042 ||  || — || January 6, 2005 || Catalina || CSS || — || align=right | 1.2 km || 
|-id=043 bgcolor=#E9E9E9
| 389043 ||  || — || October 26, 2008 || Mount Lemmon || Mount Lemmon Survey || — || align=right | 1.5 km || 
|-id=044 bgcolor=#E9E9E9
| 389044 ||  || — || October 25, 2008 || Mount Lemmon || Mount Lemmon Survey || — || align=right | 1.4 km || 
|-id=045 bgcolor=#E9E9E9
| 389045 ||  || — || November 2, 2008 || Socorro || LINEAR || — || align=right | 4.1 km || 
|-id=046 bgcolor=#E9E9E9
| 389046 ||  || — || November 1, 2008 || Mount Lemmon || Mount Lemmon Survey || — || align=right | 1.5 km || 
|-id=047 bgcolor=#E9E9E9
| 389047 ||  || — || November 2, 2008 || Kitt Peak || Spacewatch || — || align=right | 2.2 km || 
|-id=048 bgcolor=#E9E9E9
| 389048 ||  || — || November 2, 2008 || Catalina || CSS || — || align=right | 1.6 km || 
|-id=049 bgcolor=#E9E9E9
| 389049 ||  || — || November 3, 2008 || Mount Lemmon || Mount Lemmon Survey || — || align=right | 1.1 km || 
|-id=050 bgcolor=#E9E9E9
| 389050 ||  || — || October 20, 2008 || Kitt Peak || Spacewatch || — || align=right | 1.8 km || 
|-id=051 bgcolor=#E9E9E9
| 389051 ||  || — || November 3, 2008 || Kitt Peak || Spacewatch || — || align=right | 1.7 km || 
|-id=052 bgcolor=#E9E9E9
| 389052 ||  || — || November 4, 2008 || Kitt Peak || Spacewatch || — || align=right | 1.5 km || 
|-id=053 bgcolor=#E9E9E9
| 389053 ||  || — || November 4, 2008 || Kitt Peak || Spacewatch || — || align=right | 1.9 km || 
|-id=054 bgcolor=#d6d6d6
| 389054 ||  || — || September 29, 2008 || Mount Lemmon || Mount Lemmon Survey || — || align=right | 2.4 km || 
|-id=055 bgcolor=#E9E9E9
| 389055 ||  || — || September 22, 2008 || Mount Lemmon || Mount Lemmon Survey || EUN || align=right | 1.8 km || 
|-id=056 bgcolor=#E9E9E9
| 389056 ||  || — || November 8, 2008 || Kitt Peak || Spacewatch || — || align=right | 1.8 km || 
|-id=057 bgcolor=#E9E9E9
| 389057 ||  || — || November 3, 2008 || Kitt Peak || Spacewatch || — || align=right | 1.9 km || 
|-id=058 bgcolor=#E9E9E9
| 389058 ||  || — || November 6, 2008 || Kitt Peak || Spacewatch || JUN || align=right | 1.3 km || 
|-id=059 bgcolor=#E9E9E9
| 389059 ||  || — || November 6, 2008 || Kitt Peak || Spacewatch || — || align=right | 1.1 km || 
|-id=060 bgcolor=#E9E9E9
| 389060 ||  || — || November 1, 2008 || Socorro || LINEAR || — || align=right | 2.5 km || 
|-id=061 bgcolor=#E9E9E9
| 389061 || 2008 WJ || — || November 18, 2008 || Sandlot || G. Hug || — || align=right | 1.1 km || 
|-id=062 bgcolor=#E9E9E9
| 389062 ||  || — || November 19, 2008 || Skylive Obs. || F. Tozzi || — || align=right | 1.9 km || 
|-id=063 bgcolor=#E9E9E9
| 389063 ||  || — || September 26, 2008 || Kitt Peak || Spacewatch || — || align=right | 1.0 km || 
|-id=064 bgcolor=#E9E9E9
| 389064 ||  || — || November 19, 2008 || Mount Lemmon || Mount Lemmon Survey || — || align=right data-sort-value="0.89" | 890 m || 
|-id=065 bgcolor=#E9E9E9
| 389065 ||  || — || November 18, 2008 || Catalina || CSS || — || align=right | 1.5 km || 
|-id=066 bgcolor=#E9E9E9
| 389066 ||  || — || November 18, 2008 || Catalina || CSS || HNS || align=right | 2.4 km || 
|-id=067 bgcolor=#E9E9E9
| 389067 ||  || — || November 20, 2008 || Kitt Peak || Spacewatch || MIS || align=right | 2.2 km || 
|-id=068 bgcolor=#E9E9E9
| 389068 ||  || — || November 7, 2008 || Mount Lemmon || Mount Lemmon Survey || — || align=right | 1.3 km || 
|-id=069 bgcolor=#E9E9E9
| 389069 ||  || — || November 20, 2008 || Socorro || LINEAR || MIS || align=right | 2.7 km || 
|-id=070 bgcolor=#E9E9E9
| 389070 ||  || — || November 18, 2008 || Kitt Peak || Spacewatch || — || align=right | 1.3 km || 
|-id=071 bgcolor=#E9E9E9
| 389071 ||  || — || November 19, 2008 || Kitt Peak || Spacewatch || MAR || align=right | 1.0 km || 
|-id=072 bgcolor=#E9E9E9
| 389072 ||  || — || November 20, 2008 || Kitt Peak || Spacewatch || — || align=right | 2.0 km || 
|-id=073 bgcolor=#E9E9E9
| 389073 ||  || — || November 1, 2008 || Mount Lemmon || Mount Lemmon Survey || — || align=right | 1.1 km || 
|-id=074 bgcolor=#E9E9E9
| 389074 ||  || — || October 10, 2008 || Catalina || CSS || — || align=right | 2.9 km || 
|-id=075 bgcolor=#fefefe
| 389075 ||  || — || November 21, 2008 || Kitt Peak || Spacewatch || NYS || align=right data-sort-value="0.70" | 700 m || 
|-id=076 bgcolor=#E9E9E9
| 389076 ||  || — || November 30, 2008 || Kitt Peak || Spacewatch || — || align=right | 1.3 km || 
|-id=077 bgcolor=#E9E9E9
| 389077 ||  || — || November 30, 2008 || Kitt Peak || Spacewatch || — || align=right | 1.2 km || 
|-id=078 bgcolor=#E9E9E9
| 389078 ||  || — || November 30, 2008 || Mount Lemmon || Mount Lemmon Survey || — || align=right | 1.4 km || 
|-id=079 bgcolor=#E9E9E9
| 389079 ||  || — || October 25, 2008 || Catalina || CSS || — || align=right | 2.0 km || 
|-id=080 bgcolor=#E9E9E9
| 389080 ||  || — || November 19, 2008 || Kitt Peak || Spacewatch || — || align=right | 1.5 km || 
|-id=081 bgcolor=#E9E9E9
| 389081 ||  || — || November 30, 2008 || Kitt Peak || Spacewatch || DOR || align=right | 2.1 km || 
|-id=082 bgcolor=#E9E9E9
| 389082 ||  || — || November 28, 2008 || La Sagra || OAM Obs. || — || align=right | 1.9 km || 
|-id=083 bgcolor=#E9E9E9
| 389083 ||  || — || December 9, 2004 || Kitt Peak || Spacewatch || — || align=right | 1.2 km || 
|-id=084 bgcolor=#E9E9E9
| 389084 ||  || — || December 18, 2004 || Mount Lemmon || Mount Lemmon Survey || — || align=right | 1.9 km || 
|-id=085 bgcolor=#E9E9E9
| 389085 ||  || — || November 30, 2008 || Socorro || LINEAR || — || align=right | 1.5 km || 
|-id=086 bgcolor=#d6d6d6
| 389086 ||  || — || December 2, 2008 || Jarnac || Jarnac Obs. || — || align=right | 2.5 km || 
|-id=087 bgcolor=#E9E9E9
| 389087 ||  || — || December 4, 2008 || Socorro || LINEAR || — || align=right | 1.6 km || 
|-id=088 bgcolor=#E9E9E9
| 389088 ||  || — || October 28, 2008 || Catalina || CSS || — || align=right | 1.5 km || 
|-id=089 bgcolor=#E9E9E9
| 389089 ||  || — || December 1, 2008 || Kitt Peak || Spacewatch || — || align=right | 2.3 km || 
|-id=090 bgcolor=#E9E9E9
| 389090 ||  || — || March 23, 2006 || Catalina || CSS || — || align=right | 2.8 km || 
|-id=091 bgcolor=#d6d6d6
| 389091 ||  || — || December 2, 2008 || Kitt Peak || Spacewatch || — || align=right | 3.4 km || 
|-id=092 bgcolor=#E9E9E9
| 389092 ||  || — || December 2, 2008 || Kitt Peak || Spacewatch || — || align=right | 1.4 km || 
|-id=093 bgcolor=#E9E9E9
| 389093 ||  || — || November 24, 2008 || Kitt Peak || Spacewatch || AEO || align=right | 1.2 km || 
|-id=094 bgcolor=#E9E9E9
| 389094 ||  || — || October 24, 2003 || Kitt Peak || Spacewatch || — || align=right | 2.5 km || 
|-id=095 bgcolor=#fefefe
| 389095 ||  || — || December 2, 2008 || Mount Lemmon || Mount Lemmon Survey || V || align=right data-sort-value="0.80" | 800 m || 
|-id=096 bgcolor=#d6d6d6
| 389096 ||  || — || December 2, 2008 || Kitt Peak || Spacewatch || URS || align=right | 3.8 km || 
|-id=097 bgcolor=#E9E9E9
| 389097 ||  || — || December 6, 2008 || Mount Lemmon || Mount Lemmon Survey || GAL || align=right | 2.0 km || 
|-id=098 bgcolor=#E9E9E9
| 389098 ||  || — || December 4, 2008 || Mount Lemmon || Mount Lemmon Survey || — || align=right | 2.4 km || 
|-id=099 bgcolor=#d6d6d6
| 389099 ||  || — || December 3, 2008 || Mount Lemmon || Mount Lemmon Survey || — || align=right | 2.5 km || 
|-id=100 bgcolor=#E9E9E9
| 389100 ||  || — || December 25, 2008 || Mayhill || A. Lowe || — || align=right | 1.7 km || 
|}

389101–389200 

|-bgcolor=#E9E9E9
| 389101 ||  || — || December 20, 2008 || Mount Lemmon || Mount Lemmon Survey || — || align=right | 1.6 km || 
|-id=102 bgcolor=#E9E9E9
| 389102 ||  || — || December 20, 2008 || Lulin Observatory || LUSS || — || align=right | 1.3 km || 
|-id=103 bgcolor=#E9E9E9
| 389103 ||  || — || December 20, 2008 || Mount Lemmon || Mount Lemmon Survey || MIS || align=right | 2.3 km || 
|-id=104 bgcolor=#fefefe
| 389104 ||  || — || November 17, 2004 || Campo Imperatore || CINEOS || NYS || align=right | 1.0 km || 
|-id=105 bgcolor=#E9E9E9
| 389105 ||  || — || December 21, 2008 || Mount Lemmon || Mount Lemmon Survey || HOF || align=right | 2.9 km || 
|-id=106 bgcolor=#E9E9E9
| 389106 ||  || — || November 21, 2008 || Mount Lemmon || Mount Lemmon Survey || PAD || align=right | 1.8 km || 
|-id=107 bgcolor=#E9E9E9
| 389107 ||  || — || December 22, 2008 || Kitt Peak || Spacewatch || — || align=right | 3.4 km || 
|-id=108 bgcolor=#E9E9E9
| 389108 ||  || — || December 22, 2008 || Kitt Peak || Spacewatch || — || align=right | 1.6 km || 
|-id=109 bgcolor=#d6d6d6
| 389109 ||  || — || December 29, 2008 || Kitt Peak || Spacewatch || — || align=right | 2.6 km || 
|-id=110 bgcolor=#E9E9E9
| 389110 ||  || — || December 5, 2008 || Mount Lemmon || Mount Lemmon Survey || MRX || align=right | 1.2 km || 
|-id=111 bgcolor=#E9E9E9
| 389111 ||  || — || December 30, 2008 || Mount Lemmon || Mount Lemmon Survey || — || align=right | 2.3 km || 
|-id=112 bgcolor=#E9E9E9
| 389112 ||  || — || December 30, 2008 || Mount Lemmon || Mount Lemmon Survey || — || align=right | 1.8 km || 
|-id=113 bgcolor=#d6d6d6
| 389113 ||  || — || December 29, 2008 || Kitt Peak || Spacewatch || — || align=right | 2.4 km || 
|-id=114 bgcolor=#E9E9E9
| 389114 ||  || — || December 29, 2008 || Kitt Peak || Spacewatch || — || align=right | 2.4 km || 
|-id=115 bgcolor=#E9E9E9
| 389115 ||  || — || December 29, 2008 || Kitt Peak || Spacewatch || — || align=right | 2.9 km || 
|-id=116 bgcolor=#E9E9E9
| 389116 ||  || — || December 29, 2008 || Kitt Peak || Spacewatch || — || align=right | 3.5 km || 
|-id=117 bgcolor=#E9E9E9
| 389117 ||  || — || December 29, 2008 || Mount Lemmon || Mount Lemmon Survey || — || align=right | 2.0 km || 
|-id=118 bgcolor=#E9E9E9
| 389118 ||  || — || December 29, 2008 || Kitt Peak || Spacewatch || — || align=right | 2.6 km || 
|-id=119 bgcolor=#E9E9E9
| 389119 ||  || — || November 24, 2008 || Mount Lemmon || Mount Lemmon Survey || — || align=right | 2.3 km || 
|-id=120 bgcolor=#E9E9E9
| 389120 ||  || — || December 29, 2008 || Kitt Peak || Spacewatch || HEN || align=right data-sort-value="0.95" | 950 m || 
|-id=121 bgcolor=#d6d6d6
| 389121 ||  || — || December 29, 2008 || Mount Lemmon || Mount Lemmon Survey || — || align=right | 2.6 km || 
|-id=122 bgcolor=#E9E9E9
| 389122 ||  || — || December 30, 2008 || Kitt Peak || Spacewatch || — || align=right | 1.2 km || 
|-id=123 bgcolor=#E9E9E9
| 389123 ||  || — || December 30, 2008 || Kitt Peak || Spacewatch || — || align=right | 2.0 km || 
|-id=124 bgcolor=#E9E9E9
| 389124 ||  || — || December 30, 2008 || Kitt Peak || Spacewatch || — || align=right | 1.3 km || 
|-id=125 bgcolor=#E9E9E9
| 389125 ||  || — || December 30, 2008 || Kitt Peak || Spacewatch || — || align=right | 1.6 km || 
|-id=126 bgcolor=#E9E9E9
| 389126 ||  || — || December 22, 2008 || Mount Lemmon || Mount Lemmon Survey || WIT || align=right | 1.0 km || 
|-id=127 bgcolor=#E9E9E9
| 389127 ||  || — || December 31, 2008 || Mount Lemmon || Mount Lemmon Survey || — || align=right | 1.4 km || 
|-id=128 bgcolor=#E9E9E9
| 389128 ||  || — || December 22, 2008 || Kitt Peak || Spacewatch || — || align=right | 1.2 km || 
|-id=129 bgcolor=#E9E9E9
| 389129 ||  || — || December 21, 2008 || Catalina || CSS || — || align=right | 2.3 km || 
|-id=130 bgcolor=#E9E9E9
| 389130 ||  || — || December 31, 2008 || Kitt Peak || Spacewatch || — || align=right | 2.3 km || 
|-id=131 bgcolor=#E9E9E9
| 389131 ||  || — || January 3, 2009 || Farra d'Isonzo || Farra d'Isonzo || — || align=right | 1.2 km || 
|-id=132 bgcolor=#d6d6d6
| 389132 ||  || — || December 22, 2008 || Kitt Peak || Spacewatch || — || align=right | 2.3 km || 
|-id=133 bgcolor=#d6d6d6
| 389133 ||  || — || January 15, 2009 || Kitt Peak || Spacewatch || URS || align=right | 3.7 km || 
|-id=134 bgcolor=#d6d6d6
| 389134 ||  || — || September 13, 2007 || Mount Lemmon || Mount Lemmon Survey || — || align=right | 2.2 km || 
|-id=135 bgcolor=#E9E9E9
| 389135 ||  || — || January 15, 2009 || Kitt Peak || Spacewatch || HOF || align=right | 2.7 km || 
|-id=136 bgcolor=#E9E9E9
| 389136 ||  || — || December 31, 2008 || Mount Lemmon || Mount Lemmon Survey || HOF || align=right | 2.3 km || 
|-id=137 bgcolor=#E9E9E9
| 389137 ||  || — || January 2, 2009 || Kitt Peak || Spacewatch || — || align=right | 1.2 km || 
|-id=138 bgcolor=#E9E9E9
| 389138 ||  || — || March 10, 2005 || Mount Lemmon || Mount Lemmon Survey || — || align=right | 1.5 km || 
|-id=139 bgcolor=#E9E9E9
| 389139 ||  || — || January 15, 2009 || Kitt Peak || Spacewatch || AGN || align=right | 1.1 km || 
|-id=140 bgcolor=#E9E9E9
| 389140 ||  || — || January 3, 2009 || Mount Lemmon || Mount Lemmon Survey || AGN || align=right | 1.4 km || 
|-id=141 bgcolor=#E9E9E9
| 389141 ||  || — || January 1, 2009 || Kitt Peak || Spacewatch || — || align=right | 2.2 km || 
|-id=142 bgcolor=#d6d6d6
| 389142 ||  || — || January 1, 2009 || Kitt Peak || Spacewatch || FIR || align=right | 3.8 km || 
|-id=143 bgcolor=#E9E9E9
| 389143 ||  || — || October 10, 2007 || Catalina || CSS || — || align=right | 2.3 km || 
|-id=144 bgcolor=#d6d6d6
| 389144 ||  || — || January 3, 2009 || Mount Lemmon || Mount Lemmon Survey || EOS || align=right | 2.1 km || 
|-id=145 bgcolor=#E9E9E9
| 389145 ||  || — || January 17, 2009 || Socorro || LINEAR || MAR || align=right | 1.3 km || 
|-id=146 bgcolor=#E9E9E9
| 389146 ||  || — || January 16, 2009 || Kitt Peak || Spacewatch || HOF || align=right | 2.9 km || 
|-id=147 bgcolor=#E9E9E9
| 389147 ||  || — || January 16, 2009 || Kitt Peak || Spacewatch || — || align=right | 2.8 km || 
|-id=148 bgcolor=#E9E9E9
| 389148 ||  || — || December 29, 2008 || Kitt Peak || Spacewatch || HEN || align=right | 1.2 km || 
|-id=149 bgcolor=#d6d6d6
| 389149 ||  || — || January 16, 2009 || Kitt Peak || Spacewatch || EOS || align=right | 2.4 km || 
|-id=150 bgcolor=#E9E9E9
| 389150 ||  || — || January 16, 2009 || Kitt Peak || Spacewatch || XIZ || align=right | 1.1 km || 
|-id=151 bgcolor=#d6d6d6
| 389151 ||  || — || January 2, 2009 || Mount Lemmon || Mount Lemmon Survey || KOR || align=right | 1.4 km || 
|-id=152 bgcolor=#d6d6d6
| 389152 ||  || — || December 30, 2008 || Mount Lemmon || Mount Lemmon Survey || NAE || align=right | 2.2 km || 
|-id=153 bgcolor=#d6d6d6
| 389153 ||  || — || January 16, 2009 || Kitt Peak || Spacewatch || THM || align=right | 2.0 km || 
|-id=154 bgcolor=#E9E9E9
| 389154 ||  || — || January 16, 2009 || Kitt Peak || Spacewatch || — || align=right | 2.3 km || 
|-id=155 bgcolor=#d6d6d6
| 389155 ||  || — || January 16, 2009 || Kitt Peak || Spacewatch || — || align=right | 3.6 km || 
|-id=156 bgcolor=#d6d6d6
| 389156 ||  || — || January 16, 2009 || Kitt Peak || Spacewatch || — || align=right | 3.1 km || 
|-id=157 bgcolor=#d6d6d6
| 389157 ||  || — || January 16, 2009 || Kitt Peak || Spacewatch || — || align=right | 2.8 km || 
|-id=158 bgcolor=#E9E9E9
| 389158 ||  || — || January 16, 2009 || Mount Lemmon || Mount Lemmon Survey || WIT || align=right | 1.0 km || 
|-id=159 bgcolor=#E9E9E9
| 389159 ||  || — || January 16, 2009 || Mount Lemmon || Mount Lemmon Survey || HOF || align=right | 3.0 km || 
|-id=160 bgcolor=#E9E9E9
| 389160 ||  || — || January 16, 2009 || Mount Lemmon || Mount Lemmon Survey || — || align=right | 1.6 km || 
|-id=161 bgcolor=#d6d6d6
| 389161 ||  || — || May 14, 2005 || Kitt Peak || Spacewatch || URS || align=right | 3.3 km || 
|-id=162 bgcolor=#E9E9E9
| 389162 ||  || — || December 29, 2008 || Kitt Peak || Spacewatch || AGN || align=right data-sort-value="0.97" | 970 m || 
|-id=163 bgcolor=#E9E9E9
| 389163 ||  || — || January 20, 2009 || Kitt Peak || Spacewatch || — || align=right | 1.9 km || 
|-id=164 bgcolor=#E9E9E9
| 389164 ||  || — || January 20, 2009 || Mount Lemmon || Mount Lemmon Survey || — || align=right | 2.7 km || 
|-id=165 bgcolor=#E9E9E9
| 389165 ||  || — || November 24, 2008 || Mount Lemmon || Mount Lemmon Survey || — || align=right | 2.7 km || 
|-id=166 bgcolor=#E9E9E9
| 389166 ||  || — || January 25, 2009 || Kitt Peak || Spacewatch || DOR || align=right | 2.8 km || 
|-id=167 bgcolor=#E9E9E9
| 389167 ||  || — || January 25, 2009 || Kitt Peak || Spacewatch || — || align=right | 1.8 km || 
|-id=168 bgcolor=#E9E9E9
| 389168 ||  || — || January 25, 2009 || Kitt Peak || Spacewatch || — || align=right | 2.7 km || 
|-id=169 bgcolor=#d6d6d6
| 389169 ||  || — || January 25, 2009 || Kitt Peak || Spacewatch || 627 || align=right | 3.7 km || 
|-id=170 bgcolor=#d6d6d6
| 389170 ||  || — || January 26, 2009 || Kitt Peak || Spacewatch || — || align=right | 4.5 km || 
|-id=171 bgcolor=#d6d6d6
| 389171 ||  || — || January 29, 2009 || Mount Lemmon || Mount Lemmon Survey || — || align=right | 4.5 km || 
|-id=172 bgcolor=#E9E9E9
| 389172 ||  || — || January 29, 2009 || Mount Lemmon || Mount Lemmon Survey || — || align=right | 2.1 km || 
|-id=173 bgcolor=#d6d6d6
| 389173 ||  || — || December 31, 2008 || Kitt Peak || Spacewatch || — || align=right | 3.0 km || 
|-id=174 bgcolor=#d6d6d6
| 389174 ||  || — || January 31, 2009 || Kitt Peak || Spacewatch || NAE || align=right | 2.7 km || 
|-id=175 bgcolor=#FA8072
| 389175 ||  || — || January 31, 2009 || Kitt Peak || Spacewatch || H || align=right data-sort-value="0.86" | 860 m || 
|-id=176 bgcolor=#E9E9E9
| 389176 ||  || — || January 31, 2009 || Kitt Peak || Spacewatch || — || align=right | 2.2 km || 
|-id=177 bgcolor=#d6d6d6
| 389177 ||  || — || January 16, 2009 || Kitt Peak || Spacewatch || — || align=right | 3.1 km || 
|-id=178 bgcolor=#E9E9E9
| 389178 ||  || — || January 31, 2009 || Kitt Peak || Spacewatch || — || align=right | 2.6 km || 
|-id=179 bgcolor=#d6d6d6
| 389179 ||  || — || January 30, 2009 || Mount Lemmon || Mount Lemmon Survey || — || align=right | 2.2 km || 
|-id=180 bgcolor=#d6d6d6
| 389180 ||  || — || January 30, 2009 || Mount Lemmon || Mount Lemmon Survey || — || align=right | 2.6 km || 
|-id=181 bgcolor=#E9E9E9
| 389181 ||  || — || January 16, 2009 || Kitt Peak || Spacewatch || PAD || align=right | 1.6 km || 
|-id=182 bgcolor=#d6d6d6
| 389182 ||  || — || January 31, 2009 || Kitt Peak || Spacewatch || KAR || align=right | 1.2 km || 
|-id=183 bgcolor=#E9E9E9
| 389183 ||  || — || January 24, 2009 || Cerro Burek || Alianza S4 Obs. || — || align=right | 2.4 km || 
|-id=184 bgcolor=#d6d6d6
| 389184 ||  || — || January 16, 2009 || Kitt Peak || Spacewatch || — || align=right | 2.9 km || 
|-id=185 bgcolor=#E9E9E9
| 389185 ||  || — || January 17, 2009 || Kitt Peak || Spacewatch || — || align=right | 2.8 km || 
|-id=186 bgcolor=#d6d6d6
| 389186 ||  || — || January 20, 2009 || Kitt Peak || Spacewatch || KAR || align=right | 1.0 km || 
|-id=187 bgcolor=#d6d6d6
| 389187 ||  || — || January 31, 2009 || Mount Lemmon || Mount Lemmon Survey || EOS || align=right | 1.9 km || 
|-id=188 bgcolor=#d6d6d6
| 389188 ||  || — || January 25, 2009 || Catalina || CSS || BRA || align=right | 2.1 km || 
|-id=189 bgcolor=#d6d6d6
| 389189 ||  || — || January 20, 2009 || Mount Lemmon || Mount Lemmon Survey || — || align=right | 3.7 km || 
|-id=190 bgcolor=#d6d6d6
| 389190 ||  || — || January 30, 2009 || Mount Lemmon || Mount Lemmon Survey || EOS || align=right | 1.8 km || 
|-id=191 bgcolor=#d6d6d6
| 389191 ||  || — || January 1, 2009 || Mount Lemmon || Mount Lemmon Survey || — || align=right | 3.0 km || 
|-id=192 bgcolor=#d6d6d6
| 389192 ||  || — || February 3, 2009 || Kitt Peak || Spacewatch || THM || align=right | 2.1 km || 
|-id=193 bgcolor=#E9E9E9
| 389193 ||  || — || January 18, 2009 || Mount Lemmon || Mount Lemmon Survey || AGN || align=right | 1.1 km || 
|-id=194 bgcolor=#d6d6d6
| 389194 ||  || — || February 1, 2009 || Mount Lemmon || Mount Lemmon Survey || — || align=right | 4.1 km || 
|-id=195 bgcolor=#d6d6d6
| 389195 ||  || — || May 26, 2006 || Mount Lemmon || Mount Lemmon Survey || — || align=right | 3.7 km || 
|-id=196 bgcolor=#d6d6d6
| 389196 ||  || — || February 1, 2009 || Kitt Peak || Spacewatch || — || align=right | 2.9 km || 
|-id=197 bgcolor=#d6d6d6
| 389197 ||  || — || February 14, 2009 || Mount Lemmon || Mount Lemmon Survey || — || align=right | 2.8 km || 
|-id=198 bgcolor=#d6d6d6
| 389198 ||  || — || February 3, 2009 || Kitt Peak || Spacewatch || — || align=right | 2.7 km || 
|-id=199 bgcolor=#E9E9E9
| 389199 ||  || — || February 14, 2009 || Catalina || CSS || HNA || align=right | 2.2 km || 
|-id=200 bgcolor=#d6d6d6
| 389200 ||  || — || February 3, 2009 || Mount Lemmon || Mount Lemmon Survey || LAU || align=right data-sort-value="0.85" | 850 m || 
|}

389201–389300 

|-bgcolor=#d6d6d6
| 389201 ||  || — || December 4, 2007 || Mount Lemmon || Mount Lemmon Survey || — || align=right | 2.6 km || 
|-id=202 bgcolor=#d6d6d6
| 389202 ||  || — || February 5, 2009 || Mount Lemmon || Mount Lemmon Survey || — || align=right | 2.4 km || 
|-id=203 bgcolor=#d6d6d6
| 389203 ||  || — || February 4, 2009 || Mount Lemmon || Mount Lemmon Survey || EOS || align=right | 2.4 km || 
|-id=204 bgcolor=#d6d6d6
| 389204 ||  || — || February 16, 2009 || Dauban || F. Kugel || THM || align=right | 2.2 km || 
|-id=205 bgcolor=#E9E9E9
| 389205 ||  || — || February 17, 2009 || Kitt Peak || Spacewatch || — || align=right | 3.3 km || 
|-id=206 bgcolor=#d6d6d6
| 389206 ||  || — || February 16, 2009 || Kitt Peak || Spacewatch || — || align=right | 2.6 km || 
|-id=207 bgcolor=#E9E9E9
| 389207 ||  || — || October 10, 2007 || Mount Lemmon || Mount Lemmon Survey || NEM || align=right | 2.4 km || 
|-id=208 bgcolor=#d6d6d6
| 389208 ||  || — || February 21, 2009 || Kitt Peak || Spacewatch || — || align=right | 3.2 km || 
|-id=209 bgcolor=#d6d6d6
| 389209 ||  || — || February 22, 2009 || Calar Alto || F. Hormuth || KAR || align=right | 1.1 km || 
|-id=210 bgcolor=#d6d6d6
| 389210 ||  || — || April 21, 2004 || Kitt Peak || Spacewatch || THM || align=right | 2.2 km || 
|-id=211 bgcolor=#d6d6d6
| 389211 ||  || — || February 28, 2009 || Socorro || LINEAR || BRA || align=right | 1.8 km || 
|-id=212 bgcolor=#E9E9E9
| 389212 ||  || — || February 19, 2009 || Kitt Peak || Spacewatch || — || align=right | 2.7 km || 
|-id=213 bgcolor=#d6d6d6
| 389213 ||  || — || February 19, 2009 || Kitt Peak || Spacewatch || — || align=right | 2.9 km || 
|-id=214 bgcolor=#d6d6d6
| 389214 ||  || — || February 21, 2009 || Kitt Peak || Spacewatch || — || align=right | 2.5 km || 
|-id=215 bgcolor=#E9E9E9
| 389215 ||  || — || February 21, 2009 || Mount Lemmon || Mount Lemmon Survey || — || align=right | 2.4 km || 
|-id=216 bgcolor=#d6d6d6
| 389216 ||  || — || February 24, 2009 || Kitt Peak || Spacewatch || — || align=right | 2.2 km || 
|-id=217 bgcolor=#d6d6d6
| 389217 ||  || — || February 27, 2009 || Kitt Peak || Spacewatch || KOR || align=right | 1.4 km || 
|-id=218 bgcolor=#d6d6d6
| 389218 ||  || — || February 28, 2009 || Mount Lemmon || Mount Lemmon Survey || — || align=right | 3.7 km || 
|-id=219 bgcolor=#d6d6d6
| 389219 ||  || — || September 11, 2001 || Anderson Mesa || LONEOS || — || align=right | 3.2 km || 
|-id=220 bgcolor=#d6d6d6
| 389220 ||  || — || February 27, 2009 || Kitt Peak || Spacewatch || — || align=right | 2.4 km || 
|-id=221 bgcolor=#d6d6d6
| 389221 ||  || — || February 27, 2009 || Kitt Peak || Spacewatch || VER || align=right | 2.4 km || 
|-id=222 bgcolor=#d6d6d6
| 389222 ||  || — || November 9, 2007 || Kitt Peak || Spacewatch || KOR || align=right | 1.4 km || 
|-id=223 bgcolor=#d6d6d6
| 389223 ||  || — || February 22, 2009 || Mount Lemmon || Mount Lemmon Survey || — || align=right | 3.0 km || 
|-id=224 bgcolor=#d6d6d6
| 389224 ||  || — || February 26, 2009 || Kitt Peak || Spacewatch || — || align=right | 3.3 km || 
|-id=225 bgcolor=#d6d6d6
| 389225 ||  || — || February 19, 2009 || Kitt Peak || Spacewatch || — || align=right | 2.6 km || 
|-id=226 bgcolor=#d6d6d6
| 389226 ||  || — || February 27, 2009 || Kitt Peak || Spacewatch || — || align=right | 2.5 km || 
|-id=227 bgcolor=#E9E9E9
| 389227 ||  || — || October 9, 2007 || Mount Lemmon || Mount Lemmon Survey || — || align=right | 2.1 km || 
|-id=228 bgcolor=#d6d6d6
| 389228 ||  || — || February 19, 2009 || Kitt Peak || Spacewatch || EOS || align=right | 2.2 km || 
|-id=229 bgcolor=#E9E9E9
| 389229 ||  || — || March 1, 2009 || Kitt Peak || Spacewatch || — || align=right | 1.7 km || 
|-id=230 bgcolor=#d6d6d6
| 389230 ||  || — || March 1, 2009 || Kitt Peak || Spacewatch || THM || align=right | 2.4 km || 
|-id=231 bgcolor=#E9E9E9
| 389231 ||  || — || March 3, 2009 || Catalina || CSS || — || align=right | 3.3 km || 
|-id=232 bgcolor=#E9E9E9
| 389232 ||  || — || March 15, 2009 || Kitt Peak || Spacewatch || HOF || align=right | 2.9 km || 
|-id=233 bgcolor=#d6d6d6
| 389233 ||  || — || March 15, 2009 || Kitt Peak || Spacewatch || — || align=right | 2.5 km || 
|-id=234 bgcolor=#d6d6d6
| 389234 ||  || — || March 15, 2009 || La Sagra || OAM Obs. || — || align=right | 3.9 km || 
|-id=235 bgcolor=#d6d6d6
| 389235 ||  || — || March 3, 2009 || Mount Lemmon || Mount Lemmon Survey || THM || align=right | 2.0 km || 
|-id=236 bgcolor=#d6d6d6
| 389236 ||  || — || March 15, 2009 || Mount Lemmon || Mount Lemmon Survey || TEL || align=right | 2.1 km || 
|-id=237 bgcolor=#d6d6d6
| 389237 ||  || — || March 2, 2009 || Mount Lemmon || Mount Lemmon Survey || — || align=right | 3.6 km || 
|-id=238 bgcolor=#d6d6d6
| 389238 ||  || — || March 2, 2009 || Kitt Peak || Spacewatch || THM || align=right | 2.3 km || 
|-id=239 bgcolor=#d6d6d6
| 389239 ||  || — || March 16, 2009 || Kitt Peak || Spacewatch || EOS || align=right | 2.3 km || 
|-id=240 bgcolor=#d6d6d6
| 389240 ||  || — || March 16, 2009 || Mount Lemmon || Mount Lemmon Survey || — || align=right | 2.4 km || 
|-id=241 bgcolor=#d6d6d6
| 389241 ||  || — || March 18, 2009 || Mount Lemmon || Mount Lemmon Survey || — || align=right | 2.2 km || 
|-id=242 bgcolor=#d6d6d6
| 389242 ||  || — || February 19, 2009 || Kitt Peak || Spacewatch || EOS || align=right | 2.2 km || 
|-id=243 bgcolor=#d6d6d6
| 389243 ||  || — || February 20, 2009 || Kitt Peak || Spacewatch || — || align=right | 3.3 km || 
|-id=244 bgcolor=#d6d6d6
| 389244 ||  || — || December 19, 2007 || Mount Lemmon || Mount Lemmon Survey || EOS || align=right | 2.3 km || 
|-id=245 bgcolor=#d6d6d6
| 389245 ||  || — || March 24, 2009 || Socorro || LINEAR || — || align=right | 3.2 km || 
|-id=246 bgcolor=#FA8072
| 389246 ||  || — || September 5, 2002 || Campo Imperatore || CINEOS || H || align=right data-sort-value="0.79" | 790 m || 
|-id=247 bgcolor=#d6d6d6
| 389247 ||  || — || March 19, 2009 || Mount Lemmon || Mount Lemmon Survey || — || align=right | 2.8 km || 
|-id=248 bgcolor=#d6d6d6
| 389248 ||  || — || December 22, 2008 || Kitt Peak || Spacewatch || — || align=right | 3.1 km || 
|-id=249 bgcolor=#d6d6d6
| 389249 ||  || — || February 20, 2009 || Kitt Peak || Spacewatch || — || align=right | 2.8 km || 
|-id=250 bgcolor=#d6d6d6
| 389250 ||  || — || January 31, 2009 || Mount Lemmon || Mount Lemmon Survey || — || align=right | 3.3 km || 
|-id=251 bgcolor=#d6d6d6
| 389251 ||  || — || March 17, 2009 || Kitt Peak || Spacewatch || — || align=right | 3.4 km || 
|-id=252 bgcolor=#d6d6d6
| 389252 ||  || — || March 18, 2009 || Catalina || CSS || — || align=right | 2.6 km || 
|-id=253 bgcolor=#d6d6d6
| 389253 ||  || — || March 28, 2009 || Mount Lemmon || Mount Lemmon Survey || — || align=right | 2.9 km || 
|-id=254 bgcolor=#d6d6d6
| 389254 ||  || — || March 28, 2009 || Kitt Peak || Spacewatch || LIX || align=right | 4.5 km || 
|-id=255 bgcolor=#d6d6d6
| 389255 ||  || — || March 24, 2009 || Mount Lemmon || Mount Lemmon Survey || — || align=right | 2.6 km || 
|-id=256 bgcolor=#d6d6d6
| 389256 ||  || — || March 27, 2009 || Mount Lemmon || Mount Lemmon Survey || KOR || align=right | 1.3 km || 
|-id=257 bgcolor=#d6d6d6
| 389257 ||  || — || March 28, 2009 || Kitt Peak || Spacewatch || — || align=right | 2.8 km || 
|-id=258 bgcolor=#d6d6d6
| 389258 ||  || — || March 29, 2009 || Mount Lemmon || Mount Lemmon Survey || EOS || align=right | 2.1 km || 
|-id=259 bgcolor=#d6d6d6
| 389259 ||  || — || March 31, 2009 || Kitt Peak || Spacewatch || — || align=right | 3.5 km || 
|-id=260 bgcolor=#d6d6d6
| 389260 ||  || — || March 16, 2009 || Kitt Peak || Spacewatch || THM || align=right | 2.4 km || 
|-id=261 bgcolor=#d6d6d6
| 389261 ||  || — || March 23, 2009 || Purple Mountain || PMO NEO || — || align=right | 3.9 km || 
|-id=262 bgcolor=#d6d6d6
| 389262 ||  || — || September 15, 2006 || Kitt Peak || Spacewatch || — || align=right | 2.6 km || 
|-id=263 bgcolor=#d6d6d6
| 389263 ||  || — || March 16, 2009 || Kitt Peak || Spacewatch || — || align=right | 3.3 km || 
|-id=264 bgcolor=#d6d6d6
| 389264 ||  || — || March 21, 2009 || Kitt Peak || Spacewatch || THM || align=right | 2.2 km || 
|-id=265 bgcolor=#d6d6d6
| 389265 ||  || — || March 31, 2009 || Kitt Peak || Spacewatch || THM || align=right | 2.2 km || 
|-id=266 bgcolor=#d6d6d6
| 389266 ||  || — || March 16, 2009 || Kitt Peak || Spacewatch || — || align=right | 3.2 km || 
|-id=267 bgcolor=#d6d6d6
| 389267 ||  || — || March 29, 2009 || Kitt Peak || Spacewatch || EOS || align=right | 2.2 km || 
|-id=268 bgcolor=#d6d6d6
| 389268 ||  || — || March 17, 2009 || Kitt Peak || Spacewatch || — || align=right | 3.1 km || 
|-id=269 bgcolor=#d6d6d6
| 389269 ||  || — || April 5, 2009 || Kitt Peak || Spacewatch || EUP || align=right | 4.3 km || 
|-id=270 bgcolor=#d6d6d6
| 389270 ||  || — || April 1, 2009 || Catalina || CSS || — || align=right | 4.4 km || 
|-id=271 bgcolor=#d6d6d6
| 389271 ||  || — || April 16, 2009 || Catalina || CSS || TIR || align=right | 3.3 km || 
|-id=272 bgcolor=#d6d6d6
| 389272 ||  || — || April 17, 2009 || Kitt Peak || Spacewatch || — || align=right | 4.2 km || 
|-id=273 bgcolor=#d6d6d6
| 389273 ||  || — || April 17, 2009 || Kitt Peak || Spacewatch || — || align=right | 3.6 km || 
|-id=274 bgcolor=#d6d6d6
| 389274 ||  || — || March 16, 2009 || Kitt Peak || Spacewatch || MEL || align=right | 3.4 km || 
|-id=275 bgcolor=#d6d6d6
| 389275 ||  || — || April 18, 2009 || Mount Lemmon || Mount Lemmon Survey || — || align=right | 2.5 km || 
|-id=276 bgcolor=#d6d6d6
| 389276 ||  || — || April 17, 2009 || Kitt Peak || Spacewatch || TIR || align=right | 2.5 km || 
|-id=277 bgcolor=#FA8072
| 389277 ||  || — || April 19, 2009 || Kitt Peak || Spacewatch || H || align=right data-sort-value="0.87" | 870 m || 
|-id=278 bgcolor=#d6d6d6
| 389278 ||  || — || August 30, 2005 || Kitt Peak || Spacewatch || — || align=right | 3.0 km || 
|-id=279 bgcolor=#d6d6d6
| 389279 ||  || — || April 22, 2009 || La Sagra || OAM Obs. || — || align=right | 2.8 km || 
|-id=280 bgcolor=#d6d6d6
| 389280 ||  || — || April 20, 2009 || Taunus || E. Schwab, R. Kling || — || align=right | 2.9 km || 
|-id=281 bgcolor=#d6d6d6
| 389281 ||  || — || April 19, 2009 || Catalina || CSS || URS || align=right | 4.4 km || 
|-id=282 bgcolor=#d6d6d6
| 389282 ||  || — || April 21, 2009 || Kitt Peak || Spacewatch || — || align=right | 3.5 km || 
|-id=283 bgcolor=#d6d6d6
| 389283 ||  || — || April 22, 2009 || Mount Lemmon || Mount Lemmon Survey || THM || align=right | 2.5 km || 
|-id=284 bgcolor=#d6d6d6
| 389284 ||  || — || April 26, 2009 || Kitt Peak || Spacewatch || — || align=right | 3.8 km || 
|-id=285 bgcolor=#d6d6d6
| 389285 ||  || — || April 28, 2009 || Mount Lemmon || Mount Lemmon Survey || — || align=right | 3.0 km || 
|-id=286 bgcolor=#d6d6d6
| 389286 ||  || — || April 27, 2009 || Catalina || CSS || BRA || align=right | 1.8 km || 
|-id=287 bgcolor=#d6d6d6
| 389287 ||  || — || April 26, 2009 || Kitt Peak || Spacewatch || — || align=right | 2.8 km || 
|-id=288 bgcolor=#d6d6d6
| 389288 ||  || — || April 22, 2009 || Mount Lemmon || Mount Lemmon Survey || — || align=right | 2.8 km || 
|-id=289 bgcolor=#d6d6d6
| 389289 ||  || — || May 13, 2009 || Mount Lemmon || Mount Lemmon Survey || HIL3:2 || align=right | 5.2 km || 
|-id=290 bgcolor=#d6d6d6
| 389290 ||  || — || May 2, 2009 || Siding Spring || SSS || TIR || align=right | 3.3 km || 
|-id=291 bgcolor=#d6d6d6
| 389291 ||  || — || May 13, 2009 || Kitt Peak || Spacewatch || — || align=right | 3.0 km || 
|-id=292 bgcolor=#d6d6d6
| 389292 ||  || — || May 2, 2009 || Catalina || CSS || — || align=right | 3.7 km || 
|-id=293 bgcolor=#d6d6d6
| 389293 Hasubick ||  ||  || May 19, 2009 || Tzec Maun || E. Schwab || EUP || align=right | 4.3 km || 
|-id=294 bgcolor=#d6d6d6
| 389294 ||  || — || May 25, 2009 || Kitt Peak || Spacewatch || — || align=right | 2.2 km || 
|-id=295 bgcolor=#d6d6d6
| 389295 ||  || — || May 26, 2009 || Kitt Peak || Spacewatch || — || align=right | 2.6 km || 
|-id=296 bgcolor=#d6d6d6
| 389296 ||  || — || May 31, 2009 || La Sagra || OAM Obs. || — || align=right | 3.7 km || 
|-id=297 bgcolor=#d6d6d6
| 389297 ||  || — || May 30, 2009 || Catalina || CSS || — || align=right | 4.6 km || 
|-id=298 bgcolor=#d6d6d6
| 389298 ||  || — || June 14, 2009 || Catalina || CSS || EUP || align=right | 4.4 km || 
|-id=299 bgcolor=#fefefe
| 389299 ||  || — || October 27, 2006 || Catalina || CSS || — || align=right data-sort-value="0.83" | 830 m || 
|-id=300 bgcolor=#fefefe
| 389300 ||  || — || August 16, 2009 || Kitt Peak || Spacewatch || — || align=right data-sort-value="0.68" | 680 m || 
|}

389301–389400 

|-bgcolor=#C2FFFF
| 389301 ||  || — || August 16, 2009 || Kitt Peak || Spacewatch || L4 || align=right | 8.2 km || 
|-id=302 bgcolor=#C2FFFF
| 389302 ||  || — || September 15, 2009 || Kitt Peak || Spacewatch || L4 || align=right | 8.9 km || 
|-id=303 bgcolor=#fefefe
| 389303 ||  || — || September 14, 2009 || Kitt Peak || Spacewatch || — || align=right data-sort-value="0.75" | 750 m || 
|-id=304 bgcolor=#C2FFFF
| 389304 ||  || — || April 4, 2003 || Kitt Peak || Spacewatch || L4 || align=right | 12 km || 
|-id=305 bgcolor=#C2FFFF
| 389305 ||  || — || September 15, 2009 || Kitt Peak || Spacewatch || L4ARK || align=right | 8.7 km || 
|-id=306 bgcolor=#fefefe
| 389306 ||  || — || September 15, 2009 || Kitt Peak || Spacewatch || — || align=right data-sort-value="0.74" | 740 m || 
|-id=307 bgcolor=#C2FFFF
| 389307 ||  || — || September 15, 2009 || Kitt Peak || Spacewatch || L4 || align=right | 9.1 km || 
|-id=308 bgcolor=#fefefe
| 389308 ||  || — || September 16, 2009 || Mount Lemmon || Mount Lemmon Survey || — || align=right data-sort-value="0.72" | 720 m || 
|-id=309 bgcolor=#C2FFFF
| 389309 ||  || — || September 9, 2008 || Mount Lemmon || Mount Lemmon Survey || L4 || align=right | 8.3 km || 
|-id=310 bgcolor=#C2FFFF
| 389310 ||  || — || September 16, 2009 || Kitt Peak || Spacewatch || L4 || align=right | 9.9 km || 
|-id=311 bgcolor=#fefefe
| 389311 ||  || — || September 16, 2009 || Kitt Peak || Spacewatch || — || align=right data-sort-value="0.71" | 710 m || 
|-id=312 bgcolor=#fefefe
| 389312 ||  || — || September 17, 2009 || Kitt Peak || Spacewatch || — || align=right data-sort-value="0.82" | 820 m || 
|-id=313 bgcolor=#C2FFFF
| 389313 ||  || — || September 17, 2009 || Kitt Peak || Spacewatch || L4 || align=right | 9.7 km || 
|-id=314 bgcolor=#C2FFFF
| 389314 ||  || — || September 18, 2009 || Kitt Peak || Spacewatch || L4 || align=right | 8.7 km || 
|-id=315 bgcolor=#fefefe
| 389315 ||  || — || September 18, 2009 || Kitt Peak || Spacewatch || — || align=right data-sort-value="0.71" | 710 m || 
|-id=316 bgcolor=#C2FFFF
| 389316 ||  || — || September 18, 2009 || Kitt Peak || Spacewatch || L4ERY || align=right | 7.4 km || 
|-id=317 bgcolor=#C2FFFF
| 389317 ||  || — || June 19, 2007 || Kitt Peak || Spacewatch || L4ERY || align=right | 9.3 km || 
|-id=318 bgcolor=#C2FFFF
| 389318 ||  || — || September 19, 2009 || Mount Lemmon || Mount Lemmon Survey || L4ERY || align=right | 9.6 km || 
|-id=319 bgcolor=#fefefe
| 389319 ||  || — || September 21, 2009 || Kitt Peak || Spacewatch || — || align=right | 1.1 km || 
|-id=320 bgcolor=#C2FFFF
| 389320 ||  || — || September 18, 2009 || Kitt Peak || Spacewatch || L4 || align=right | 11 km || 
|-id=321 bgcolor=#C2FFFF
| 389321 ||  || — || September 22, 2009 || Kitt Peak || Spacewatch || L4 || align=right | 7.3 km || 
|-id=322 bgcolor=#C2FFFF
| 389322 ||  || — || September 22, 2009 || Kitt Peak || Spacewatch || L4 || align=right | 9.0 km || 
|-id=323 bgcolor=#C2FFFF
| 389323 ||  || — || September 24, 2009 || Kitt Peak || Spacewatch || L4ERY || align=right | 7.4 km || 
|-id=324 bgcolor=#fefefe
| 389324 ||  || — || September 19, 2009 || Kitt Peak || Spacewatch || — || align=right data-sort-value="0.86" | 860 m || 
|-id=325 bgcolor=#fefefe
| 389325 ||  || — || September 20, 2009 || La Sagra || OAM Obs. || — || align=right data-sort-value="0.75" | 750 m || 
|-id=326 bgcolor=#C2FFFF
| 389326 ||  || — || September 6, 2008 || Kitt Peak || Spacewatch || L4 || align=right | 8.3 km || 
|-id=327 bgcolor=#C2FFFF
| 389327 ||  || — || July 30, 2008 || Mount Lemmon || Mount Lemmon Survey || L4ERY || align=right | 7.2 km || 
|-id=328 bgcolor=#C2FFFF
| 389328 ||  || — || September 17, 2009 || Kitt Peak || Spacewatch || L4 || align=right | 7.2 km || 
|-id=329 bgcolor=#fefefe
| 389329 ||  || — || September 23, 2009 || Mount Lemmon || Mount Lemmon Survey || — || align=right data-sort-value="0.88" | 880 m || 
|-id=330 bgcolor=#fefefe
| 389330 ||  || — || September 16, 2009 || Kitt Peak || Spacewatch || — || align=right data-sort-value="0.78" | 780 m || 
|-id=331 bgcolor=#C2FFFF
| 389331 ||  || — || September 25, 2009 || Kitt Peak || Spacewatch || L4 || align=right | 9.1 km || 
|-id=332 bgcolor=#C2FFFF
| 389332 ||  || — || September 25, 2009 || Kitt Peak || Spacewatch || L4ERY || align=right | 8.1 km || 
|-id=333 bgcolor=#fefefe
| 389333 ||  || — || September 17, 2009 || Kitt Peak || Spacewatch || FLO || align=right data-sort-value="0.64" | 640 m || 
|-id=334 bgcolor=#C2FFFF
| 389334 ||  || — || September 27, 2009 || Mount Lemmon || Mount Lemmon Survey || L4ARK || align=right | 7.0 km || 
|-id=335 bgcolor=#C2FFFF
| 389335 ||  || — || September 29, 2009 || Kitt Peak || Spacewatch || L4 || align=right | 8.7 km || 
|-id=336 bgcolor=#C2FFFF
| 389336 ||  || — || September 17, 2009 || Kitt Peak || Spacewatch || L4 || align=right | 8.0 km || 
|-id=337 bgcolor=#C2FFFF
| 389337 ||  || — || September 20, 2009 || Kitt Peak || Spacewatch || L4 || align=right | 7.1 km || 
|-id=338 bgcolor=#E9E9E9
| 389338 ||  || — || August 18, 2009 || Kitt Peak || Spacewatch || HOF || align=right | 2.6 km || 
|-id=339 bgcolor=#fefefe
| 389339 ||  || — || September 19, 2009 || Mount Lemmon || Mount Lemmon Survey || — || align=right data-sort-value="0.68" | 680 m || 
|-id=340 bgcolor=#fefefe
| 389340 ||  || — || September 16, 2009 || Kitt Peak || Spacewatch || — || align=right data-sort-value="0.66" | 660 m || 
|-id=341 bgcolor=#C2FFFF
| 389341 ||  || — || September 25, 2009 || Kitt Peak || Spacewatch || L4 || align=right | 7.1 km || 
|-id=342 bgcolor=#C2FFFF
| 389342 ||  || — || September 5, 2008 || Kitt Peak || Spacewatch || L4 || align=right | 6.9 km || 
|-id=343 bgcolor=#fefefe
| 389343 ||  || — || April 14, 2008 || Kitt Peak || Spacewatch || — || align=right data-sort-value="0.74" | 740 m || 
|-id=344 bgcolor=#fefefe
| 389344 ||  || — || October 14, 2009 || La Sagra || OAM Obs. || — || align=right data-sort-value="0.85" | 850 m || 
|-id=345 bgcolor=#d6d6d6
| 389345 ||  || — || September 29, 2009 || Kitt Peak || Spacewatch || — || align=right | 3.6 km || 
|-id=346 bgcolor=#d6d6d6
| 389346 ||  || — || October 16, 2009 || Mount Lemmon || Mount Lemmon Survey || 3:2 || align=right | 4.8 km || 
|-id=347 bgcolor=#C2FFFF
| 389347 ||  || — || September 28, 2009 || Mount Lemmon || Mount Lemmon Survey || L4 || align=right | 8.2 km || 
|-id=348 bgcolor=#fefefe
| 389348 ||  || — || October 16, 2009 || Mount Lemmon || Mount Lemmon Survey || NYS || align=right data-sort-value="0.63" | 630 m || 
|-id=349 bgcolor=#fefefe
| 389349 ||  || — || October 18, 2009 || La Sagra || OAM Obs. || NYS || align=right | 1.5 km || 
|-id=350 bgcolor=#d6d6d6
| 389350 ||  || — || March 20, 2001 || Kitt Peak || Spacewatch || — || align=right | 3.7 km || 
|-id=351 bgcolor=#fefefe
| 389351 ||  || — || September 21, 2009 || Mount Lemmon || Mount Lemmon Survey || — || align=right data-sort-value="0.97" | 970 m || 
|-id=352 bgcolor=#fefefe
| 389352 ||  || — || October 23, 2009 || Mount Lemmon || Mount Lemmon Survey || — || align=right | 1.4 km || 
|-id=353 bgcolor=#C2FFFF
| 389353 ||  || — || September 23, 2009 || Mount Lemmon || Mount Lemmon Survey || L4ARK || align=right | 8.4 km || 
|-id=354 bgcolor=#fefefe
| 389354 ||  || — || September 22, 2009 || Mount Lemmon || Mount Lemmon Survey || ERI || align=right | 2.1 km || 
|-id=355 bgcolor=#C2FFFF
| 389355 ||  || — || September 3, 2008 || Kitt Peak || Spacewatch || L4 || align=right | 7.7 km || 
|-id=356 bgcolor=#C2FFFF
| 389356 ||  || — || October 22, 2009 || Catalina || CSS || L4 || align=right | 10 km || 
|-id=357 bgcolor=#fefefe
| 389357 ||  || — || October 24, 2009 || Catalina || CSS || — || align=right data-sort-value="0.78" | 780 m || 
|-id=358 bgcolor=#fefefe
| 389358 ||  || — || October 25, 2009 || Kitt Peak || Spacewatch || FLO || align=right data-sort-value="0.67" | 670 m || 
|-id=359 bgcolor=#fefefe
| 389359 ||  || — || October 18, 2009 || Mount Lemmon || Mount Lemmon Survey || NYS || align=right data-sort-value="0.72" | 720 m || 
|-id=360 bgcolor=#C2FFFF
| 389360 ||  || — || October 26, 2009 || Mount Lemmon || Mount Lemmon Survey || L4 || align=right | 8.9 km || 
|-id=361 bgcolor=#FA8072
| 389361 ||  || — || November 10, 2009 || Catalina || CSS || PHO || align=right data-sort-value="0.93" | 930 m || 
|-id=362 bgcolor=#C2FFFF
| 389362 ||  || — || November 8, 2009 || Kitt Peak || Spacewatch || L4 || align=right | 6.7 km || 
|-id=363 bgcolor=#fefefe
| 389363 ||  || — || November 8, 2009 || Catalina || CSS || — || align=right data-sort-value="0.94" | 940 m || 
|-id=364 bgcolor=#fefefe
| 389364 ||  || — || November 8, 2009 || Catalina || CSS || — || align=right data-sort-value="0.85" | 850 m || 
|-id=365 bgcolor=#fefefe
| 389365 ||  || — || November 8, 2009 || Catalina || CSS || FLO || align=right data-sort-value="0.70" | 700 m || 
|-id=366 bgcolor=#fefefe
| 389366 ||  || — || November 8, 2009 || Catalina || CSS || — || align=right data-sort-value="0.85" | 850 m || 
|-id=367 bgcolor=#fefefe
| 389367 ||  || — || November 12, 2009 || La Sagra || OAM Obs. || — || align=right data-sort-value="0.75" | 750 m || 
|-id=368 bgcolor=#fefefe
| 389368 ||  || — || November 11, 2009 || Socorro || LINEAR || FLO || align=right data-sort-value="0.70" | 700 m || 
|-id=369 bgcolor=#fefefe
| 389369 ||  || — || November 10, 2009 || Kitt Peak || Spacewatch || V || align=right data-sort-value="0.74" | 740 m || 
|-id=370 bgcolor=#fefefe
| 389370 ||  || — || November 10, 2009 || Kitt Peak || Spacewatch || — || align=right | 1.5 km || 
|-id=371 bgcolor=#fefefe
| 389371 ||  || — || November 10, 2009 || Kitt Peak || Spacewatch || ERI || align=right | 1.9 km || 
|-id=372 bgcolor=#fefefe
| 389372 ||  || — || November 11, 2009 || Mount Lemmon || Mount Lemmon Survey || V || align=right data-sort-value="0.74" | 740 m || 
|-id=373 bgcolor=#fefefe
| 389373 ||  || — || November 8, 2009 || Kitt Peak || Spacewatch || EUT || align=right data-sort-value="0.72" | 720 m || 
|-id=374 bgcolor=#fefefe
| 389374 ||  || — || November 16, 2009 || Mount Lemmon || Mount Lemmon Survey || MAS || align=right data-sort-value="0.71" | 710 m || 
|-id=375 bgcolor=#fefefe
| 389375 ||  || — || November 18, 2009 || Socorro || LINEAR || — || align=right data-sort-value="0.85" | 850 m || 
|-id=376 bgcolor=#fefefe
| 389376 ||  || — || November 16, 2009 || Kitt Peak || Spacewatch || FLO || align=right data-sort-value="0.78" | 780 m || 
|-id=377 bgcolor=#fefefe
| 389377 ||  || — || November 17, 2009 || Kitt Peak || Spacewatch || — || align=right data-sort-value="0.91" | 910 m || 
|-id=378 bgcolor=#fefefe
| 389378 ||  || — || November 18, 2009 || Kitt Peak || Spacewatch || NYS || align=right data-sort-value="0.51" | 510 m || 
|-id=379 bgcolor=#fefefe
| 389379 ||  || — || November 18, 2009 || Mount Lemmon || Mount Lemmon Survey || — || align=right | 1.7 km || 
|-id=380 bgcolor=#fefefe
| 389380 ||  || — || November 16, 2009 || Mount Lemmon || Mount Lemmon Survey || NYS || align=right data-sort-value="0.57" | 570 m || 
|-id=381 bgcolor=#E9E9E9
| 389381 ||  || — || November 28, 2005 || Kitt Peak || Spacewatch || — || align=right | 1.2 km || 
|-id=382 bgcolor=#fefefe
| 389382 ||  || — || November 19, 2009 || Kitt Peak || Spacewatch || NYS || align=right data-sort-value="0.78" | 780 m || 
|-id=383 bgcolor=#fefefe
| 389383 ||  || — || November 20, 2009 || Mount Lemmon || Mount Lemmon Survey || — || align=right data-sort-value="0.99" | 990 m || 
|-id=384 bgcolor=#fefefe
| 389384 ||  || — || November 19, 2009 || Kitt Peak || Spacewatch || — || align=right data-sort-value="0.89" | 890 m || 
|-id=385 bgcolor=#fefefe
| 389385 ||  || — || November 20, 2009 || Mount Lemmon || Mount Lemmon Survey || — || align=right | 1.8 km || 
|-id=386 bgcolor=#fefefe
| 389386 ||  || — || November 21, 2009 || Kitt Peak || Spacewatch || NYS || align=right data-sort-value="0.52" | 520 m || 
|-id=387 bgcolor=#fefefe
| 389387 ||  || — || September 22, 2009 || Mount Lemmon || Mount Lemmon Survey || — || align=right data-sort-value="0.79" | 790 m || 
|-id=388 bgcolor=#fefefe
| 389388 ||  || — || November 23, 2009 || Kitt Peak || Spacewatch || — || align=right data-sort-value="0.63" | 630 m || 
|-id=389 bgcolor=#fefefe
| 389389 ||  || — || November 16, 2009 || Mount Lemmon || Mount Lemmon Survey || — || align=right data-sort-value="0.68" | 680 m || 
|-id=390 bgcolor=#fefefe
| 389390 ||  || — || November 17, 2009 || Kitt Peak || Spacewatch || — || align=right | 1.4 km || 
|-id=391 bgcolor=#fefefe
| 389391 ||  || — || November 19, 2009 || Mount Lemmon || Mount Lemmon Survey || — || align=right data-sort-value="0.91" | 910 m || 
|-id=392 bgcolor=#fefefe
| 389392 ||  || — || November 20, 2009 || Mount Lemmon || Mount Lemmon Survey || NYS || align=right data-sort-value="0.55" | 550 m || 
|-id=393 bgcolor=#fefefe
| 389393 ||  || — || November 16, 2009 || Socorro || LINEAR || — || align=right data-sort-value="0.74" | 740 m || 
|-id=394 bgcolor=#fefefe
| 389394 ||  || — || February 27, 2007 || Kitt Peak || Spacewatch || FLO || align=right data-sort-value="0.76" | 760 m || 
|-id=395 bgcolor=#fefefe
| 389395 ||  || — || December 8, 2009 || La Sagra || OAM Obs. || V || align=right data-sort-value="0.78" | 780 m || 
|-id=396 bgcolor=#E9E9E9
| 389396 ||  || — || December 15, 2009 || Mayhill || iTelescope Obs. || HNS || align=right | 1.1 km || 
|-id=397 bgcolor=#fefefe
| 389397 ||  || — || December 11, 2009 || Dauban || F. Kugel || — || align=right data-sort-value="0.99" | 990 m || 
|-id=398 bgcolor=#fefefe
| 389398 ||  || — || December 15, 2009 || Mount Lemmon || Mount Lemmon Survey || V || align=right data-sort-value="0.80" | 800 m || 
|-id=399 bgcolor=#fefefe
| 389399 ||  || — || December 15, 2009 || Mount Lemmon || Mount Lemmon Survey || V || align=right data-sort-value="0.75" | 750 m || 
|-id=400 bgcolor=#E9E9E9
| 389400 ||  || — || December 15, 2009 || Mount Lemmon || Mount Lemmon Survey || EUN || align=right | 2.0 km || 
|}

389401–389500 

|-bgcolor=#fefefe
| 389401 ||  || — || December 15, 2009 || Mount Lemmon || Mount Lemmon Survey || NYS || align=right data-sort-value="0.72" | 720 m || 
|-id=402 bgcolor=#fefefe
| 389402 ||  || — || December 21, 2006 || Kitt Peak || Spacewatch || FLO || align=right data-sort-value="0.84" | 840 m || 
|-id=403 bgcolor=#fefefe
| 389403 ||  || — || December 25, 2009 || Kitt Peak || Spacewatch || MAS || align=right data-sort-value="0.70" | 700 m || 
|-id=404 bgcolor=#fefefe
| 389404 ||  || — || January 4, 2010 || Kitt Peak || Spacewatch || — || align=right data-sort-value="0.89" | 890 m || 
|-id=405 bgcolor=#fefefe
| 389405 ||  || — || January 6, 2010 || Catalina || CSS || — || align=right | 2.0 km || 
|-id=406 bgcolor=#fefefe
| 389406 ||  || — || December 19, 2009 || Mount Lemmon || Mount Lemmon Survey || — || align=right data-sort-value="0.78" | 780 m || 
|-id=407 bgcolor=#fefefe
| 389407 ||  || — || January 7, 2010 || Mount Lemmon || Mount Lemmon Survey || V || align=right data-sort-value="0.75" | 750 m || 
|-id=408 bgcolor=#fefefe
| 389408 ||  || — || January 6, 2010 || Kitt Peak || Spacewatch || NYS || align=right | 1.7 km || 
|-id=409 bgcolor=#fefefe
| 389409 ||  || — || November 21, 2009 || Mount Lemmon || Mount Lemmon Survey || — || align=right | 1.3 km || 
|-id=410 bgcolor=#fefefe
| 389410 ||  || — || January 7, 2010 || Kitt Peak || Spacewatch || — || align=right data-sort-value="0.81" | 810 m || 
|-id=411 bgcolor=#fefefe
| 389411 ||  || — || July 30, 2008 || Mount Lemmon || Mount Lemmon Survey || — || align=right | 1.1 km || 
|-id=412 bgcolor=#fefefe
| 389412 ||  || — || January 8, 2010 || Kitt Peak || Spacewatch || NYS || align=right data-sort-value="0.67" | 670 m || 
|-id=413 bgcolor=#fefefe
| 389413 ||  || — || December 8, 2005 || Kitt Peak || Spacewatch || — || align=right | 1.00 km || 
|-id=414 bgcolor=#E9E9E9
| 389414 ||  || — || February 25, 2006 || Kitt Peak || Spacewatch || — || align=right data-sort-value="0.92" | 920 m || 
|-id=415 bgcolor=#E9E9E9
| 389415 ||  || — || January 15, 2010 || WISE || WISE || — || align=right | 2.2 km || 
|-id=416 bgcolor=#fefefe
| 389416 || 2010 BY || — || January 17, 2010 || Bisei SG Center || BATTeRS || MAS || align=right data-sort-value="0.63" | 630 m || 
|-id=417 bgcolor=#E9E9E9
| 389417 ||  || — || January 18, 2010 || WISE || WISE || — || align=right | 2.7 km || 
|-id=418 bgcolor=#C2FFFF
| 389418 ||  || — || June 17, 2005 || Mount Lemmon || Mount Lemmon Survey || L4 || align=right | 13 km || 
|-id=419 bgcolor=#E9E9E9
| 389419 ||  || — || January 22, 2010 || WISE || WISE || — || align=right | 3.0 km || 
|-id=420 bgcolor=#E9E9E9
| 389420 ||  || — || March 5, 1997 || Kitt Peak || Spacewatch || ADE || align=right | 1.8 km || 
|-id=421 bgcolor=#E9E9E9
| 389421 ||  || — || June 1, 1997 || Kitt Peak || Spacewatch || — || align=right | 3.0 km || 
|-id=422 bgcolor=#fefefe
| 389422 ||  || — || October 5, 2004 || Kitt Peak || Spacewatch || V || align=right data-sort-value="0.73" | 730 m || 
|-id=423 bgcolor=#d6d6d6
| 389423 ||  || — || February 6, 2010 || WISE || WISE || ELF || align=right | 4.6 km || 
|-id=424 bgcolor=#d6d6d6
| 389424 ||  || — || February 8, 2010 || WISE || WISE || — || align=right | 3.9 km || 
|-id=425 bgcolor=#fefefe
| 389425 ||  || — || February 6, 2010 || Mayhill || A. Lowe || V || align=right data-sort-value="0.65" | 650 m || 
|-id=426 bgcolor=#E9E9E9
| 389426 ||  || — || February 11, 2010 || WISE || WISE || — || align=right | 2.6 km || 
|-id=427 bgcolor=#fefefe
| 389427 ||  || — || February 9, 2010 || Kitt Peak || Spacewatch || — || align=right data-sort-value="0.83" | 830 m || 
|-id=428 bgcolor=#fefefe
| 389428 ||  || — || June 9, 2007 || Kitt Peak || Spacewatch || — || align=right data-sort-value="0.69" | 690 m || 
|-id=429 bgcolor=#E9E9E9
| 389429 ||  || — || February 9, 2010 || Kitt Peak || Spacewatch || — || align=right data-sort-value="0.98" | 980 m || 
|-id=430 bgcolor=#E9E9E9
| 389430 ||  || — || January 6, 2010 || Kitt Peak || Spacewatch || — || align=right | 2.0 km || 
|-id=431 bgcolor=#fefefe
| 389431 ||  || — || October 27, 2005 || Kitt Peak || Spacewatch || NYS || align=right data-sort-value="0.78" | 780 m || 
|-id=432 bgcolor=#E9E9E9
| 389432 ||  || — || February 6, 2010 || Mount Lemmon || Mount Lemmon Survey || — || align=right | 2.2 km || 
|-id=433 bgcolor=#E9E9E9
| 389433 ||  || — || February 14, 2010 || WISE || WISE || — || align=right | 2.5 km || 
|-id=434 bgcolor=#fefefe
| 389434 ||  || — || January 12, 2010 || Mount Lemmon || Mount Lemmon Survey || — || align=right | 1.9 km || 
|-id=435 bgcolor=#fefefe
| 389435 ||  || — || January 11, 2010 || Kitt Peak || Spacewatch || NYS || align=right data-sort-value="0.65" | 650 m || 
|-id=436 bgcolor=#E9E9E9
| 389436 ||  || — || January 15, 2010 || Mount Lemmon || Mount Lemmon Survey || — || align=right | 2.8 km || 
|-id=437 bgcolor=#E9E9E9
| 389437 ||  || — || February 13, 2010 || Mount Lemmon || Mount Lemmon Survey || — || align=right | 2.1 km || 
|-id=438 bgcolor=#E9E9E9
| 389438 ||  || — || February 6, 2006 || Mount Lemmon || Mount Lemmon Survey || — || align=right | 1.0 km || 
|-id=439 bgcolor=#E9E9E9
| 389439 ||  || — || February 14, 2010 || Kitt Peak || Spacewatch || — || align=right data-sort-value="0.87" | 870 m || 
|-id=440 bgcolor=#E9E9E9
| 389440 ||  || — || January 27, 2006 || Mount Lemmon || Mount Lemmon Survey || — || align=right data-sort-value="0.87" | 870 m || 
|-id=441 bgcolor=#fefefe
| 389441 ||  || — || February 14, 2010 || Mount Lemmon || Mount Lemmon Survey || MAS || align=right data-sort-value="0.72" | 720 m || 
|-id=442 bgcolor=#E9E9E9
| 389442 ||  || — || February 9, 2010 || Kitt Peak || Spacewatch || — || align=right | 1.2 km || 
|-id=443 bgcolor=#E9E9E9
| 389443 ||  || — || June 7, 2003 || Kitt Peak || Spacewatch || — || align=right | 1.4 km || 
|-id=444 bgcolor=#E9E9E9
| 389444 ||  || — || February 14, 2010 || Kitt Peak || Spacewatch || — || align=right | 1.1 km || 
|-id=445 bgcolor=#E9E9E9
| 389445 ||  || — || February 10, 2010 || Kitt Peak || Spacewatch || — || align=right | 1.2 km || 
|-id=446 bgcolor=#E9E9E9
| 389446 ||  || — || April 25, 2006 || Kitt Peak || Spacewatch || EUN || align=right | 1.1 km || 
|-id=447 bgcolor=#E9E9E9
| 389447 ||  || — || February 14, 2010 || Haleakala || Pan-STARRS || — || align=right data-sort-value="0.88" | 880 m || 
|-id=448 bgcolor=#fefefe
| 389448 ||  || — || February 14, 2010 || Haleakala || Pan-STARRS || — || align=right | 1.2 km || 
|-id=449 bgcolor=#E9E9E9
| 389449 ||  || — || February 13, 2010 || Kitt Peak || Spacewatch || — || align=right | 1.9 km || 
|-id=450 bgcolor=#fefefe
| 389450 ||  || — || September 23, 2008 || Mount Lemmon || Mount Lemmon Survey || — || align=right data-sort-value="0.98" | 980 m || 
|-id=451 bgcolor=#d6d6d6
| 389451 ||  || — || January 31, 2009 || Mount Lemmon || Mount Lemmon Survey || EUP || align=right | 6.2 km || 
|-id=452 bgcolor=#d6d6d6
| 389452 ||  || — || February 9, 2010 || WISE || WISE || — || align=right | 4.8 km || 
|-id=453 bgcolor=#E9E9E9
| 389453 ||  || — || February 16, 2010 || Mount Lemmon || Mount Lemmon Survey || — || align=right | 2.0 km || 
|-id=454 bgcolor=#E9E9E9
| 389454 ||  || — || February 16, 2010 || Kitt Peak || Spacewatch || BRU || align=right | 3.2 km || 
|-id=455 bgcolor=#d6d6d6
| 389455 ||  || — || February 16, 2010 || WISE || WISE || ALA || align=right | 3.0 km || 
|-id=456 bgcolor=#fefefe
| 389456 ||  || — || November 19, 2009 || Mount Lemmon || Mount Lemmon Survey || — || align=right | 1.2 km || 
|-id=457 bgcolor=#d6d6d6
| 389457 ||  || — || February 16, 2010 || Catalina || CSS || — || align=right | 4.9 km || 
|-id=458 bgcolor=#fefefe
| 389458 ||  || — || October 17, 2008 || Kitt Peak || Spacewatch || V || align=right data-sort-value="0.62" | 620 m || 
|-id=459 bgcolor=#E9E9E9
| 389459 ||  || — || February 17, 2010 || Kitt Peak || Spacewatch || — || align=right | 1.2 km || 
|-id=460 bgcolor=#E9E9E9
| 389460 ||  || — || January 7, 2006 || Kitt Peak || Spacewatch || — || align=right data-sort-value="0.94" | 940 m || 
|-id=461 bgcolor=#d6d6d6
| 389461 ||  || — || February 26, 2010 || WISE || WISE || — || align=right | 2.7 km || 
|-id=462 bgcolor=#fefefe
| 389462 ||  || — || April 28, 2003 || Kitt Peak || Spacewatch || — || align=right | 1.3 km || 
|-id=463 bgcolor=#E9E9E9
| 389463 ||  || — || October 22, 2003 || Kitt Peak || Spacewatch || — || align=right | 2.2 km || 
|-id=464 bgcolor=#E9E9E9
| 389464 ||  || — || March 4, 2010 || Kitt Peak || Spacewatch || — || align=right | 1.2 km || 
|-id=465 bgcolor=#E9E9E9
| 389465 ||  || — || March 11, 2010 || La Sagra || OAM Obs. || — || align=right | 2.4 km || 
|-id=466 bgcolor=#E9E9E9
| 389466 ||  || — || March 4, 2010 || Kitt Peak || Spacewatch || — || align=right | 1.7 km || 
|-id=467 bgcolor=#E9E9E9
| 389467 ||  || — || March 9, 2010 || La Sagra || OAM Obs. || EUN || align=right | 1.4 km || 
|-id=468 bgcolor=#E9E9E9
| 389468 ||  || — || March 12, 2010 || Calvin-Rehoboth || Calvin–Rehoboth Obs. || BRG || align=right | 1.5 km || 
|-id=469 bgcolor=#E9E9E9
| 389469 ||  || — || February 15, 2010 || Catalina || CSS || BAR || align=right | 1.9 km || 
|-id=470 bgcolor=#E9E9E9
| 389470 Jan ||  ||  || March 15, 2010 || Montmagastrell || Montmagastrell Obs. || EUN || align=right | 1.1 km || 
|-id=471 bgcolor=#E9E9E9
| 389471 ||  || — || March 15, 2010 || Dauban || F. Kugel || — || align=right | 1.4 km || 
|-id=472 bgcolor=#E9E9E9
| 389472 ||  || — || March 10, 2010 || Moletai || K. Černis, J. Zdanavičius || IAN || align=right data-sort-value="0.94" | 940 m || 
|-id=473 bgcolor=#E9E9E9
| 389473 ||  || — || March 13, 2010 || Kitt Peak || Spacewatch || MIS || align=right | 2.2 km || 
|-id=474 bgcolor=#E9E9E9
| 389474 ||  || — || March 12, 2010 || Kitt Peak || Spacewatch || — || align=right | 1.2 km || 
|-id=475 bgcolor=#fefefe
| 389475 ||  || — || March 12, 2010 || Kitt Peak || Spacewatch || — || align=right data-sort-value="0.88" | 880 m || 
|-id=476 bgcolor=#E9E9E9
| 389476 ||  || — || March 12, 2010 || Mount Lemmon || Mount Lemmon Survey || — || align=right | 1.5 km || 
|-id=477 bgcolor=#E9E9E9
| 389477 ||  || — || March 13, 2010 || Kitt Peak || Spacewatch || — || align=right | 1.6 km || 
|-id=478 bgcolor=#E9E9E9
| 389478 Rivera-Valentín ||  ||  || January 21, 2010 || WISE || WISE || ADE || align=right | 2.0 km || 
|-id=479 bgcolor=#E9E9E9
| 389479 ||  || — || April 18, 2002 || Kitt Peak || Spacewatch || — || align=right | 1.6 km || 
|-id=480 bgcolor=#E9E9E9
| 389480 ||  || — || May 9, 2006 || Mount Lemmon || Mount Lemmon Survey || — || align=right | 1.4 km || 
|-id=481 bgcolor=#E9E9E9
| 389481 ||  || — || March 14, 2010 || Kitt Peak || Spacewatch || — || align=right data-sort-value="0.92" | 920 m || 
|-id=482 bgcolor=#E9E9E9
| 389482 ||  || — || March 12, 2010 || Kitt Peak || Spacewatch || — || align=right | 1.3 km || 
|-id=483 bgcolor=#E9E9E9
| 389483 ||  || — || March 4, 2010 || Kitt Peak || Spacewatch || — || align=right | 2.1 km || 
|-id=484 bgcolor=#E9E9E9
| 389484 ||  || — || March 4, 2010 || Kitt Peak || Spacewatch || MIS || align=right | 2.0 km || 
|-id=485 bgcolor=#E9E9E9
| 389485 ||  || — || March 14, 2010 || Catalina || CSS || — || align=right | 3.9 km || 
|-id=486 bgcolor=#E9E9E9
| 389486 ||  || — || March 13, 2010 || Kitt Peak || Spacewatch || — || align=right | 1.3 km || 
|-id=487 bgcolor=#E9E9E9
| 389487 ||  || — || September 15, 2007 || Kitt Peak || Spacewatch || — || align=right | 1.4 km || 
|-id=488 bgcolor=#E9E9E9
| 389488 ||  || — || March 15, 2010 || Kitt Peak || Spacewatch || MAR || align=right | 1.1 km || 
|-id=489 bgcolor=#E9E9E9
| 389489 ||  || — || March 12, 2010 || Kitt Peak || Spacewatch || — || align=right | 1.6 km || 
|-id=490 bgcolor=#E9E9E9
| 389490 ||  || — || February 27, 2006 || Mount Lemmon || Mount Lemmon Survey || — || align=right | 2.0 km || 
|-id=491 bgcolor=#E9E9E9
| 389491 ||  || — || April 21, 2006 || Kitt Peak || Spacewatch || — || align=right | 1.5 km || 
|-id=492 bgcolor=#E9E9E9
| 389492 ||  || — || March 16, 2010 || Mount Lemmon || Mount Lemmon Survey || — || align=right | 2.4 km || 
|-id=493 bgcolor=#E9E9E9
| 389493 ||  || — || March 14, 2010 || Kitt Peak || Spacewatch || — || align=right | 1.1 km || 
|-id=494 bgcolor=#E9E9E9
| 389494 ||  || — || August 16, 2007 || XuYi || PMO NEO || — || align=right data-sort-value="0.99" | 990 m || 
|-id=495 bgcolor=#E9E9E9
| 389495 ||  || — || March 18, 2010 || Kitt Peak || Spacewatch || — || align=right | 1.8 km || 
|-id=496 bgcolor=#fefefe
| 389496 ||  || — || December 25, 2005 || Mount Lemmon || Mount Lemmon Survey || — || align=right data-sort-value="0.84" | 840 m || 
|-id=497 bgcolor=#E9E9E9
| 389497 ||  || — || February 14, 2010 || Kitt Peak || Spacewatch || — || align=right | 1.6 km || 
|-id=498 bgcolor=#E9E9E9
| 389498 ||  || — || September 18, 2003 || Kitt Peak || Spacewatch || — || align=right | 1.1 km || 
|-id=499 bgcolor=#d6d6d6
| 389499 ||  || — || March 18, 2010 || Kitt Peak || Spacewatch || — || align=right | 3.2 km || 
|-id=500 bgcolor=#E9E9E9
| 389500 ||  || — || March 18, 2010 || Mount Lemmon || Mount Lemmon Survey || — || align=right | 4.2 km || 
|}

389501–389600 

|-bgcolor=#E9E9E9
| 389501 ||  || — || March 16, 2010 || Mount Lemmon || Mount Lemmon Survey || HNS || align=right | 1.5 km || 
|-id=502 bgcolor=#E9E9E9
| 389502 ||  || — || March 25, 2010 || Mount Lemmon || Mount Lemmon Survey || — || align=right | 2.2 km || 
|-id=503 bgcolor=#E9E9E9
| 389503 ||  || — || March 16, 2010 || Catalina || CSS || — || align=right | 3.4 km || 
|-id=504 bgcolor=#E9E9E9
| 389504 ||  || — || March 26, 2010 || Kitt Peak || Spacewatch || — || align=right | 1.9 km || 
|-id=505 bgcolor=#E9E9E9
| 389505 ||  || — || April 4, 2010 || Kitt Peak || Spacewatch || — || align=right | 2.3 km || 
|-id=506 bgcolor=#E9E9E9
| 389506 ||  || — || April 8, 2010 || Mayhill || A. Lowe || JUN || align=right | 1.2 km || 
|-id=507 bgcolor=#E9E9E9
| 389507 ||  || — || April 5, 2010 || Kitt Peak || Spacewatch || — || align=right | 1.6 km || 
|-id=508 bgcolor=#E9E9E9
| 389508 ||  || — || April 5, 2010 || Kitt Peak || Spacewatch || — || align=right | 1.7 km || 
|-id=509 bgcolor=#E9E9E9
| 389509 ||  || — || September 27, 2003 || Kitt Peak || Spacewatch || — || align=right | 1.7 km || 
|-id=510 bgcolor=#E9E9E9
| 389510 ||  || — || October 1, 2003 || Kitt Peak || Spacewatch || — || align=right | 2.1 km || 
|-id=511 bgcolor=#E9E9E9
| 389511 ||  || — || April 10, 2010 || Kitt Peak || Spacewatch || — || align=right | 1.7 km || 
|-id=512 bgcolor=#E9E9E9
| 389512 ||  || — || April 11, 2010 || Kitt Peak || Spacewatch || NEM || align=right | 2.8 km || 
|-id=513 bgcolor=#E9E9E9
| 389513 ||  || — || April 6, 2010 || Kitt Peak || Spacewatch || — || align=right | 1.8 km || 
|-id=514 bgcolor=#d6d6d6
| 389514 ||  || — || February 16, 2010 || Mount Lemmon || Mount Lemmon Survey || BRA || align=right | 1.8 km || 
|-id=515 bgcolor=#E9E9E9
| 389515 ||  || — || April 5, 2010 || Catalina || CSS || — || align=right | 1.9 km || 
|-id=516 bgcolor=#E9E9E9
| 389516 ||  || — || October 25, 2008 || Kitt Peak || Spacewatch || — || align=right | 1.6 km || 
|-id=517 bgcolor=#E9E9E9
| 389517 ||  || — || March 17, 2010 || Siding Spring || SSS || — || align=right | 3.1 km || 
|-id=518 bgcolor=#E9E9E9
| 389518 ||  || — || October 2, 2003 || Kitt Peak || Spacewatch || — || align=right | 1.9 km || 
|-id=519 bgcolor=#E9E9E9
| 389519 ||  || — || April 7, 2010 || Sandlot || G. Hug || — || align=right | 3.2 km || 
|-id=520 bgcolor=#E9E9E9
| 389520 ||  || — || April 11, 2010 || Kitt Peak || Spacewatch || ADE || align=right | 2.3 km || 
|-id=521 bgcolor=#E9E9E9
| 389521 ||  || — || April 15, 2010 || Catalina || CSS || HNA || align=right | 3.2 km || 
|-id=522 bgcolor=#E9E9E9
| 389522 ||  || — || April 6, 2010 || Bergisch Gladbach || W. Bickel || — || align=right | 2.4 km || 
|-id=523 bgcolor=#d6d6d6
| 389523 ||  || — || April 30, 2010 || WISE || WISE || — || align=right | 2.8 km || 
|-id=524 bgcolor=#E9E9E9
| 389524 ||  || — || April 20, 2010 || Kitt Peak || Spacewatch || — || align=right | 1.7 km || 
|-id=525 bgcolor=#E9E9E9
| 389525 ||  || — || May 3, 2010 || Kitt Peak || Spacewatch || JUN || align=right | 1.0 km || 
|-id=526 bgcolor=#E9E9E9
| 389526 ||  || — || October 9, 2007 || Kitt Peak || Spacewatch || — || align=right | 1.6 km || 
|-id=527 bgcolor=#E9E9E9
| 389527 ||  || — || January 25, 2010 || WISE || WISE || — || align=right | 2.6 km || 
|-id=528 bgcolor=#E9E9E9
| 389528 ||  || — || March 21, 2010 || Mount Lemmon || Mount Lemmon Survey || — || align=right | 1.8 km || 
|-id=529 bgcolor=#E9E9E9
| 389529 ||  || — || September 21, 2003 || Kitt Peak || Spacewatch || RAF || align=right | 1.1 km || 
|-id=530 bgcolor=#d6d6d6
| 389530 ||  || — || May 8, 2010 || WISE || WISE || — || align=right | 2.9 km || 
|-id=531 bgcolor=#d6d6d6
| 389531 ||  || — || May 9, 2010 || WISE || WISE || — || align=right | 4.0 km || 
|-id=532 bgcolor=#E9E9E9
| 389532 ||  || — || January 20, 2009 || Mount Lemmon || Mount Lemmon Survey || — || align=right | 2.5 km || 
|-id=533 bgcolor=#E9E9E9
| 389533 ||  || — || May 5, 2010 || Catalina || CSS || — || align=right | 2.1 km || 
|-id=534 bgcolor=#E9E9E9
| 389534 ||  || — || January 31, 2010 || WISE || WISE || — || align=right | 2.0 km || 
|-id=535 bgcolor=#E9E9E9
| 389535 ||  || — || April 2, 2006 || Mount Lemmon || Mount Lemmon Survey || — || align=right | 1.1 km || 
|-id=536 bgcolor=#E9E9E9
| 389536 ||  || — || December 1, 2008 || Kitt Peak || Spacewatch || — || align=right | 2.4 km || 
|-id=537 bgcolor=#d6d6d6
| 389537 ||  || — || May 20, 2005 || Mount Lemmon || Mount Lemmon Survey || — || align=right | 3.6 km || 
|-id=538 bgcolor=#E9E9E9
| 389538 ||  || — || January 2, 2009 || Kitt Peak || Spacewatch || AST || align=right | 1.6 km || 
|-id=539 bgcolor=#d6d6d6
| 389539 ||  || — || May 4, 2010 || Kitt Peak || Spacewatch || EOS || align=right | 2.0 km || 
|-id=540 bgcolor=#d6d6d6
| 389540 ||  || — || May 24, 2010 || WISE || WISE || EUP || align=right | 4.6 km || 
|-id=541 bgcolor=#d6d6d6
| 389541 ||  || — || May 29, 2010 || WISE || WISE || URS || align=right | 3.4 km || 
|-id=542 bgcolor=#E9E9E9
| 389542 ||  || — || May 21, 2010 || Mount Lemmon || Mount Lemmon Survey || — || align=right | 1.6 km || 
|-id=543 bgcolor=#d6d6d6
| 389543 ||  || — || June 6, 2010 || WISE || WISE || — || align=right | 3.1 km || 
|-id=544 bgcolor=#d6d6d6
| 389544 ||  || — || June 11, 2010 || WISE || WISE || — || align=right | 4.8 km || 
|-id=545 bgcolor=#E9E9E9
| 389545 ||  || — || October 15, 2007 || Mount Lemmon || Mount Lemmon Survey || — || align=right | 1.4 km || 
|-id=546 bgcolor=#d6d6d6
| 389546 ||  || — || February 23, 2007 || Kitt Peak || Spacewatch || ULA7:4 || align=right | 5.7 km || 
|-id=547 bgcolor=#d6d6d6
| 389547 ||  || — || June 27, 2010 || WISE || WISE || — || align=right | 3.7 km || 
|-id=548 bgcolor=#E9E9E9
| 389548 ||  || — || July 24, 2010 || WISE || WISE || — || align=right | 3.1 km || 
|-id=549 bgcolor=#d6d6d6
| 389549 ||  || — || September 30, 1999 || Kitt Peak || Spacewatch || — || align=right | 4.6 km || 
|-id=550 bgcolor=#d6d6d6
| 389550 ||  || — || August 4, 2010 || Socorro || LINEAR || — || align=right | 4.2 km || 
|-id=551 bgcolor=#d6d6d6
| 389551 ||  || — || April 29, 2003 || Kitt Peak || Spacewatch || — || align=right | 3.8 km || 
|-id=552 bgcolor=#fefefe
| 389552 ||  || — || September 29, 1997 || Kitt Peak || Spacewatch || H || align=right data-sort-value="0.78" | 780 m || 
|-id=553 bgcolor=#d6d6d6
| 389553 ||  || — || September 7, 2004 || Socorro || LINEAR || TIR || align=right | 3.5 km || 
|-id=554 bgcolor=#d6d6d6
| 389554 ||  || — || March 11, 2007 || Kitt Peak || Spacewatch || HYG || align=right | 3.0 km || 
|-id=555 bgcolor=#d6d6d6
| 389555 ||  || — || March 28, 2008 || Mount Lemmon || Mount Lemmon Survey || — || align=right | 2.8 km || 
|-id=556 bgcolor=#C2FFFF
| 389556 ||  || — || September 16, 2010 || Mount Lemmon || Mount Lemmon Survey || L4 || align=right | 7.6 km || 
|-id=557 bgcolor=#d6d6d6
| 389557 ||  || — || July 27, 2010 || WISE || WISE || URS || align=right | 3.6 km || 
|-id=558 bgcolor=#C2FFFF
| 389558 ||  || — || September 17, 2009 || Kitt Peak || Spacewatch || L4 || align=right | 9.0 km || 
|-id=559 bgcolor=#C2FFFF
| 389559 ||  || — || August 27, 2009 || Kitt Peak || Spacewatch || L4 || align=right | 7.8 km || 
|-id=560 bgcolor=#C2FFFF
| 389560 ||  || — || September 18, 2009 || Kitt Peak || Spacewatch || L4ERY || align=right | 7.0 km || 
|-id=561 bgcolor=#C2FFFF
| 389561 ||  || — || October 16, 2009 || Mount Lemmon || Mount Lemmon Survey || L4 || align=right | 9.0 km || 
|-id=562 bgcolor=#C2FFFF
| 389562 ||  || — || May 14, 2005 || Mount Lemmon || Mount Lemmon Survey || L4 || align=right | 11 km || 
|-id=563 bgcolor=#C2FFFF
| 389563 ||  || — || October 13, 2010 || Mount Lemmon || Mount Lemmon Survey || L4 || align=right | 8.8 km || 
|-id=564 bgcolor=#C2FFFF
| 389564 ||  || — || October 16, 2009 || Catalina || CSS || L4 || align=right | 8.5 km || 
|-id=565 bgcolor=#C2FFFF
| 389565 ||  || — || September 15, 2009 || Kitt Peak || Spacewatch || L4 || align=right | 6.7 km || 
|-id=566 bgcolor=#C2FFFF
| 389566 ||  || — || August 10, 2010 || WISE || WISE || L4 || align=right | 12 km || 
|-id=567 bgcolor=#C2FFFF
| 389567 ||  || — || November 6, 2010 || Mount Lemmon || Mount Lemmon Survey || L4 || align=right | 7.5 km || 
|-id=568 bgcolor=#C2FFFF
| 389568 ||  || — || April 7, 2003 || Kitt Peak || Spacewatch || L4ARK || align=right | 8.0 km || 
|-id=569 bgcolor=#C2FFFF
| 389569 ||  || — || October 13, 2010 || Mount Lemmon || Mount Lemmon Survey || L4 || align=right | 8.1 km || 
|-id=570 bgcolor=#C2FFFF
| 389570 ||  || — || September 21, 2009 || Kitt Peak || Spacewatch || L4 || align=right | 8.6 km || 
|-id=571 bgcolor=#C2FFFF
| 389571 ||  || — || September 27, 1997 || Kitt Peak || Spacewatch || L4 || align=right | 9.3 km || 
|-id=572 bgcolor=#C2FFFF
| 389572 ||  || — || September 18, 2009 || Kitt Peak || Spacewatch || L4 || align=right | 7.3 km || 
|-id=573 bgcolor=#C2FFFF
| 389573 ||  || — || September 17, 2009 || Kitt Peak || Spacewatch || L4 || align=right | 8.3 km || 
|-id=574 bgcolor=#C2FFFF
| 389574 ||  || — || October 29, 2010 || Kitt Peak || Spacewatch || L4 || align=right | 11 km || 
|-id=575 bgcolor=#C2FFFF
| 389575 ||  || — || October 16, 2009 || Mount Lemmon || Mount Lemmon Survey || L4 || align=right | 7.1 km || 
|-id=576 bgcolor=#fefefe
| 389576 ||  || — || March 26, 2008 || Kitt Peak || Spacewatch || — || align=right data-sort-value="0.89" | 890 m || 
|-id=577 bgcolor=#fefefe
| 389577 ||  || — || August 13, 2004 || Campo Imperatore || CINEOS || H || align=right data-sort-value="0.61" | 610 m || 
|-id=578 bgcolor=#d6d6d6
| 389578 ||  || — || February 1, 2010 || WISE || WISE || EUP || align=right | 4.3 km || 
|-id=579 bgcolor=#fefefe
| 389579 ||  || — || August 25, 2001 || Anderson Mesa || LONEOS || H || align=right data-sort-value="0.73" | 730 m || 
|-id=580 bgcolor=#fefefe
| 389580 ||  || — || December 14, 2010 || Mount Lemmon || Mount Lemmon Survey || H || align=right data-sort-value="0.82" | 820 m || 
|-id=581 bgcolor=#fefefe
| 389581 ||  || — || October 16, 2009 || Catalina || CSS || — || align=right | 1.1 km || 
|-id=582 bgcolor=#fefefe
| 389582 ||  || — || October 18, 2006 || Kitt Peak || Spacewatch || — || align=right data-sort-value="0.67" | 670 m || 
|-id=583 bgcolor=#fefefe
| 389583 ||  || — || January 8, 2011 || Mount Lemmon || Mount Lemmon Survey || V || align=right | 1.3 km || 
|-id=584 bgcolor=#fefefe
| 389584 ||  || — || March 2, 2011 || Kitt Peak || Spacewatch || NYS || align=right data-sort-value="0.54" | 540 m || 
|-id=585 bgcolor=#fefefe
| 389585 ||  || — || June 10, 2008 || Kitt Peak || Spacewatch || FLO || align=right data-sort-value="0.62" | 620 m || 
|-id=586 bgcolor=#fefefe
| 389586 ||  || — || February 25, 2011 || Mount Lemmon || Mount Lemmon Survey || — || align=right | 1.1 km || 
|-id=587 bgcolor=#fefefe
| 389587 ||  || — || March 27, 2011 || Kitt Peak || Spacewatch || FLO || align=right data-sort-value="0.55" | 550 m || 
|-id=588 bgcolor=#fefefe
| 389588 ||  || — || May 5, 2008 || Mount Lemmon || Mount Lemmon Survey || V || align=right data-sort-value="0.75" | 750 m || 
|-id=589 bgcolor=#d6d6d6
| 389589 ||  || — || October 2, 1997 || Caussols || ODAS || — || align=right | 4.5 km || 
|-id=590 bgcolor=#fefefe
| 389590 ||  || — || March 26, 2011 || Kitt Peak || Spacewatch || — || align=right data-sort-value="0.83" | 830 m || 
|-id=591 bgcolor=#fefefe
| 389591 ||  || — || November 10, 2009 || Kitt Peak || Spacewatch || — || align=right data-sort-value="0.79" | 790 m || 
|-id=592 bgcolor=#fefefe
| 389592 ||  || — || September 16, 2009 || Mount Lemmon || Mount Lemmon Survey || — || align=right data-sort-value="0.75" | 750 m || 
|-id=593 bgcolor=#fefefe
| 389593 ||  || — || February 8, 2007 || Mount Lemmon || Mount Lemmon Survey || — || align=right | 1.1 km || 
|-id=594 bgcolor=#fefefe
| 389594 ||  || — || April 1, 2011 || Kitt Peak || Spacewatch || — || align=right data-sort-value="0.68" | 680 m || 
|-id=595 bgcolor=#fefefe
| 389595 ||  || — || October 1, 2005 || Kitt Peak || Spacewatch || — || align=right data-sort-value="0.70" | 700 m || 
|-id=596 bgcolor=#fefefe
| 389596 ||  || — || March 11, 2011 || Kitt Peak || Spacewatch || — || align=right data-sort-value="0.95" | 950 m || 
|-id=597 bgcolor=#fefefe
| 389597 ||  || — || April 13, 2011 || Kitt Peak || Spacewatch || FLO || align=right data-sort-value="0.56" | 560 m || 
|-id=598 bgcolor=#fefefe
| 389598 ||  || — || November 12, 2005 || Kitt Peak || Spacewatch || V || align=right data-sort-value="0.79" | 790 m || 
|-id=599 bgcolor=#fefefe
| 389599 ||  || — || December 29, 2003 || Kitt Peak || Spacewatch || FLO || align=right data-sort-value="0.53" | 530 m || 
|-id=600 bgcolor=#fefefe
| 389600 ||  || — || April 4, 2011 || Kitt Peak || Spacewatch || — || align=right data-sort-value="0.76" | 760 m || 
|}

389601–389700 

|-bgcolor=#fefefe
| 389601 ||  || — || April 2, 2011 || Kitt Peak || Spacewatch || — || align=right data-sort-value="0.78" | 780 m || 
|-id=602 bgcolor=#fefefe
| 389602 ||  || — || August 31, 2005 || Kitt Peak || Spacewatch || — || align=right data-sort-value="0.71" | 710 m || 
|-id=603 bgcolor=#fefefe
| 389603 ||  || — || April 12, 2011 || Catalina || CSS || — || align=right data-sort-value="0.81" | 810 m || 
|-id=604 bgcolor=#fefefe
| 389604 ||  || — || May 7, 2008 || Mount Lemmon || Mount Lemmon Survey || — || align=right data-sort-value="0.73" | 730 m || 
|-id=605 bgcolor=#fefefe
| 389605 ||  || — || March 1, 2011 || Mount Lemmon || Mount Lemmon Survey || MAS || align=right data-sort-value="0.82" | 820 m || 
|-id=606 bgcolor=#fefefe
| 389606 ||  || — || May 11, 1996 || Kitt Peak || Spacewatch || NYS || align=right data-sort-value="0.69" | 690 m || 
|-id=607 bgcolor=#fefefe
| 389607 ||  || — || October 25, 2005 || Kitt Peak || Spacewatch || — || align=right | 1.0 km || 
|-id=608 bgcolor=#fefefe
| 389608 ||  || — || August 29, 2005 || Kitt Peak || Spacewatch || FLO || align=right data-sort-value="0.64" | 640 m || 
|-id=609 bgcolor=#fefefe
| 389609 ||  || — || May 13, 2004 || Kitt Peak || Spacewatch || V || align=right data-sort-value="0.59" | 590 m || 
|-id=610 bgcolor=#fefefe
| 389610 ||  || — || April 27, 2011 || Kitt Peak || Spacewatch || FLO || align=right data-sort-value="0.58" | 580 m || 
|-id=611 bgcolor=#E9E9E9
| 389611 ||  || — || March 15, 2007 || Mount Lemmon || Mount Lemmon Survey || — || align=right | 1.2 km || 
|-id=612 bgcolor=#fefefe
| 389612 ||  || — || April 13, 2011 || Kitt Peak || Spacewatch || FLO || align=right data-sort-value="0.56" | 560 m || 
|-id=613 bgcolor=#fefefe
| 389613 ||  || — || April 6, 2011 || Mount Lemmon || Mount Lemmon Survey || V || align=right data-sort-value="0.77" | 770 m || 
|-id=614 bgcolor=#E9E9E9
| 389614 ||  || — || November 21, 2009 || Mount Lemmon || Mount Lemmon Survey || WIT || align=right | 1.1 km || 
|-id=615 bgcolor=#fefefe
| 389615 ||  || — || June 2, 2008 || Mount Lemmon || Mount Lemmon Survey || — || align=right data-sort-value="0.55" | 550 m || 
|-id=616 bgcolor=#E9E9E9
| 389616 ||  || — || April 24, 2007 || Kitt Peak || Spacewatch || — || align=right | 1.5 km || 
|-id=617 bgcolor=#fefefe
| 389617 ||  || — || March 14, 2004 || Kitt Peak || Spacewatch || — || align=right data-sort-value="0.87" | 870 m || 
|-id=618 bgcolor=#fefefe
| 389618 ||  || — || April 29, 2008 || Mount Lemmon || Mount Lemmon Survey || FLO || align=right data-sort-value="0.46" | 460 m || 
|-id=619 bgcolor=#fefefe
| 389619 ||  || — || January 27, 2007 || Mount Lemmon || Mount Lemmon Survey || — || align=right data-sort-value="0.92" | 920 m || 
|-id=620 bgcolor=#fefefe
| 389620 ||  || — || August 30, 2005 || Kitt Peak || Spacewatch || — || align=right data-sort-value="0.73" | 730 m || 
|-id=621 bgcolor=#fefefe
| 389621 ||  || — || October 29, 1999 || Kitt Peak || Spacewatch || — || align=right data-sort-value="0.89" | 890 m || 
|-id=622 bgcolor=#d6d6d6
| 389622 ||  || — || April 2, 2006 || Kitt Peak || Spacewatch || — || align=right | 2.4 km || 
|-id=623 bgcolor=#E9E9E9
| 389623 ||  || — || October 23, 2008 || Kitt Peak || Spacewatch || — || align=right | 1.7 km || 
|-id=624 bgcolor=#fefefe
| 389624 ||  || — || January 17, 2007 || Kitt Peak || Spacewatch || — || align=right data-sort-value="0.67" | 670 m || 
|-id=625 bgcolor=#fefefe
| 389625 ||  || — || October 31, 2005 || Mount Lemmon || Mount Lemmon Survey || — || align=right data-sort-value="0.90" | 900 m || 
|-id=626 bgcolor=#fefefe
| 389626 ||  || — || April 27, 2011 || Kitt Peak || Spacewatch || — || align=right | 1.2 km || 
|-id=627 bgcolor=#fefefe
| 389627 ||  || — || May 12, 2011 || Mount Lemmon || Mount Lemmon Survey || NYS || align=right data-sort-value="0.79" | 790 m || 
|-id=628 bgcolor=#fefefe
| 389628 ||  || — || October 30, 2005 || Kitt Peak || Spacewatch || — || align=right data-sort-value="0.84" | 840 m || 
|-id=629 bgcolor=#fefefe
| 389629 ||  || — || September 6, 2008 || Catalina || CSS || — || align=right data-sort-value="0.81" | 810 m || 
|-id=630 bgcolor=#fefefe
| 389630 ||  || — || September 2, 2008 || Kitt Peak || Spacewatch || FLO || align=right data-sort-value="0.65" | 650 m || 
|-id=631 bgcolor=#fefefe
| 389631 ||  || — || November 21, 2009 || Mount Lemmon || Mount Lemmon Survey || — || align=right data-sort-value="0.83" | 830 m || 
|-id=632 bgcolor=#E9E9E9
| 389632 ||  || — || March 26, 2006 || Kitt Peak || Spacewatch || HOF || align=right | 4.0 km || 
|-id=633 bgcolor=#fefefe
| 389633 ||  || — || April 29, 2011 || Mount Lemmon || Mount Lemmon Survey || V || align=right data-sort-value="0.73" | 730 m || 
|-id=634 bgcolor=#fefefe
| 389634 ||  || — || April 30, 2011 || Mount Lemmon || Mount Lemmon Survey || — || align=right data-sort-value="0.65" | 650 m || 
|-id=635 bgcolor=#fefefe
| 389635 ||  || — || August 28, 1995 || Kitt Peak || Spacewatch || — || align=right data-sort-value="0.62" | 620 m || 
|-id=636 bgcolor=#fefefe
| 389636 ||  || — || October 25, 2005 || Kitt Peak || Spacewatch || V || align=right data-sort-value="0.86" | 860 m || 
|-id=637 bgcolor=#fefefe
| 389637 ||  || — || August 7, 2008 || Kitt Peak || Spacewatch || — || align=right data-sort-value="0.75" | 750 m || 
|-id=638 bgcolor=#E9E9E9
| 389638 ||  || — || April 11, 2011 || Mount Lemmon || Mount Lemmon Survey || — || align=right | 2.8 km || 
|-id=639 bgcolor=#fefefe
| 389639 ||  || — || September 23, 2005 || Kitt Peak || Spacewatch || V || align=right data-sort-value="0.65" | 650 m || 
|-id=640 bgcolor=#fefefe
| 389640 ||  || — || September 4, 2008 || Kitt Peak || Spacewatch || — || align=right data-sort-value="0.86" | 860 m || 
|-id=641 bgcolor=#fefefe
| 389641 ||  || — || July 29, 2008 || Mount Lemmon || Mount Lemmon Survey || — || align=right data-sort-value="0.68" | 680 m || 
|-id=642 bgcolor=#fefefe
| 389642 ||  || — || April 15, 2007 || Catalina || CSS || V || align=right data-sort-value="0.73" | 730 m || 
|-id=643 bgcolor=#fefefe
| 389643 ||  || — || December 27, 2006 || Mount Lemmon || Mount Lemmon Survey || V || align=right data-sort-value="0.78" | 780 m || 
|-id=644 bgcolor=#fefefe
| 389644 ||  || — || May 15, 2004 || Socorro || LINEAR || FLO || align=right data-sort-value="0.69" | 690 m || 
|-id=645 bgcolor=#d6d6d6
| 389645 ||  || — || September 28, 2006 || Catalina || CSS || EOS || align=right | 2.7 km || 
|-id=646 bgcolor=#fefefe
| 389646 ||  || — || June 3, 2000 || Kitt Peak || Spacewatch || — || align=right data-sort-value="0.94" | 940 m || 
|-id=647 bgcolor=#d6d6d6
| 389647 ||  || — || March 13, 2010 || WISE || WISE || — || align=right | 3.7 km || 
|-id=648 bgcolor=#fefefe
| 389648 ||  || — || February 10, 2007 || Mount Lemmon || Mount Lemmon Survey || — || align=right data-sort-value="0.70" | 700 m || 
|-id=649 bgcolor=#E9E9E9
| 389649 ||  || — || April 6, 2010 || Catalina || CSS || — || align=right | 3.4 km || 
|-id=650 bgcolor=#fefefe
| 389650 ||  || — || February 21, 2006 || Mount Lemmon || Mount Lemmon Survey || NYS || align=right | 1.1 km || 
|-id=651 bgcolor=#d6d6d6
| 389651 ||  || — || October 16, 2006 || Catalina || CSS || HYG || align=right | 2.7 km || 
|-id=652 bgcolor=#E9E9E9
| 389652 ||  || — || September 27, 1998 || Kitt Peak || Spacewatch || — || align=right | 1.6 km || 
|-id=653 bgcolor=#E9E9E9
| 389653 ||  || — || October 23, 2008 || Kitt Peak || Spacewatch || — || align=right | 1.2 km || 
|-id=654 bgcolor=#fefefe
| 389654 ||  || — || September 28, 2000 || Kitt Peak || Spacewatch || MAS || align=right data-sort-value="0.91" | 910 m || 
|-id=655 bgcolor=#fefefe
| 389655 ||  || — || March 6, 2003 || Anderson Mesa || LONEOS || — || align=right | 1.2 km || 
|-id=656 bgcolor=#d6d6d6
| 389656 ||  || — || June 10, 2011 || Mount Lemmon || Mount Lemmon Survey || ALA || align=right | 3.7 km || 
|-id=657 bgcolor=#E9E9E9
| 389657 ||  || — || September 14, 2007 || Kitt Peak || Spacewatch || — || align=right data-sort-value="0.90" | 900 m || 
|-id=658 bgcolor=#fefefe
| 389658 ||  || — || March 15, 2007 || Catalina || CSS || — || align=right | 1.0 km || 
|-id=659 bgcolor=#E9E9E9
| 389659 ||  || — || October 8, 2007 || Kitt Peak || Spacewatch || — || align=right | 1.6 km || 
|-id=660 bgcolor=#fefefe
| 389660 ||  || — || December 18, 2004 || Mount Lemmon || Mount Lemmon Survey || MAS || align=right | 1.0 km || 
|-id=661 bgcolor=#d6d6d6
| 389661 ||  || — || June 21, 2011 || Kitt Peak || Spacewatch || — || align=right | 3.4 km || 
|-id=662 bgcolor=#fefefe
| 389662 ||  || — || October 27, 2008 || Kitt Peak || Spacewatch || NYS || align=right data-sort-value="0.82" | 820 m || 
|-id=663 bgcolor=#E9E9E9
| 389663 ||  || — || October 10, 2007 || Mount Lemmon || Mount Lemmon Survey || NEM || align=right | 3.0 km || 
|-id=664 bgcolor=#E9E9E9
| 389664 ||  || — || November 1, 2008 || Mount Lemmon || Mount Lemmon Survey || — || align=right | 1.2 km || 
|-id=665 bgcolor=#E9E9E9
| 389665 ||  || — || December 17, 2003 || Kitt Peak || Spacewatch || — || align=right | 3.1 km || 
|-id=666 bgcolor=#E9E9E9
| 389666 ||  || — || November 23, 2008 || Kitt Peak || Spacewatch || — || align=right | 2.9 km || 
|-id=667 bgcolor=#fefefe
| 389667 ||  || — || November 28, 2000 || Kitt Peak || Spacewatch || NYS || align=right | 1.0 km || 
|-id=668 bgcolor=#E9E9E9
| 389668 ||  || — || September 22, 2003 || Anderson Mesa || LONEOS || — || align=right | 1.2 km || 
|-id=669 bgcolor=#fefefe
| 389669 ||  || — || August 24, 2007 || Kitt Peak || Spacewatch || — || align=right data-sort-value="0.86" | 860 m || 
|-id=670 bgcolor=#E9E9E9
| 389670 ||  || — || November 19, 2007 || Kitt Peak || Spacewatch || AGN || align=right | 1.3 km || 
|-id=671 bgcolor=#E9E9E9
| 389671 ||  || — || August 20, 2003 || Campo Imperatore || CINEOS || — || align=right | 1.2 km || 
|-id=672 bgcolor=#d6d6d6
| 389672 ||  || — || January 31, 2009 || Mount Lemmon || Mount Lemmon Survey || — || align=right | 3.8 km || 
|-id=673 bgcolor=#fefefe
| 389673 ||  || — || February 2, 2006 || Kitt Peak || Spacewatch || V || align=right data-sort-value="0.73" | 730 m || 
|-id=674 bgcolor=#fefefe
| 389674 ||  || — || January 23, 2006 || Kitt Peak || Spacewatch || NYS || align=right data-sort-value="0.83" | 830 m || 
|-id=675 bgcolor=#E9E9E9
| 389675 ||  || — || October 5, 2007 || Kitt Peak || Spacewatch || — || align=right | 1.3 km || 
|-id=676 bgcolor=#fefefe
| 389676 ||  || — || February 17, 2010 || Kitt Peak || Spacewatch || NYS || align=right data-sort-value="0.79" | 790 m || 
|-id=677 bgcolor=#E9E9E9
| 389677 ||  || — || May 9, 2006 || Mount Lemmon || Mount Lemmon Survey || — || align=right | 1.6 km || 
|-id=678 bgcolor=#d6d6d6
| 389678 ||  || — || December 19, 2007 || Mount Lemmon || Mount Lemmon Survey || — || align=right | 3.6 km || 
|-id=679 bgcolor=#d6d6d6
| 389679 ||  || — || January 25, 2009 || Kitt Peak || Spacewatch || CHA || align=right | 2.1 km || 
|-id=680 bgcolor=#E9E9E9
| 389680 ||  || — || September 15, 2007 || Anderson Mesa || LONEOS || MAR || align=right | 1.5 km || 
|-id=681 bgcolor=#d6d6d6
| 389681 ||  || — || February 28, 2009 || Kitt Peak || Spacewatch || — || align=right | 2.9 km || 
|-id=682 bgcolor=#E9E9E9
| 389682 ||  || — || March 8, 2005 || Mount Lemmon || Mount Lemmon Survey || GEF || align=right | 1.5 km || 
|-id=683 bgcolor=#d6d6d6
| 389683 ||  || — || October 11, 2006 || Kitt Peak || Spacewatch || — || align=right | 2.8 km || 
|-id=684 bgcolor=#E9E9E9
| 389684 ||  || — || March 3, 2009 || Kitt Peak || Spacewatch || — || align=right | 3.0 km || 
|-id=685 bgcolor=#fefefe
| 389685 ||  || — || January 23, 2006 || Kitt Peak || Spacewatch || — || align=right | 1.3 km || 
|-id=686 bgcolor=#d6d6d6
| 389686 ||  || — || October 19, 2006 || Catalina || CSS || — || align=right | 3.7 km || 
|-id=687 bgcolor=#d6d6d6
| 389687 ||  || — || December 18, 2007 || Mount Lemmon || Mount Lemmon Survey || — || align=right | 2.9 km || 
|-id=688 bgcolor=#d6d6d6
| 389688 ||  || — || January 19, 2009 || Mount Lemmon || Mount Lemmon Survey || — || align=right | 3.5 km || 
|-id=689 bgcolor=#d6d6d6
| 389689 ||  || — || November 3, 2007 || Kitt Peak || Spacewatch || — || align=right | 2.6 km || 
|-id=690 bgcolor=#d6d6d6
| 389690 ||  || — || August 23, 2001 || Kitt Peak || Spacewatch || CHA || align=right | 2.4 km || 
|-id=691 bgcolor=#E9E9E9
| 389691 ||  || — || April 19, 2006 || Kitt Peak || Spacewatch || — || align=right | 1.5 km || 
|-id=692 bgcolor=#fefefe
| 389692 ||  || — || April 7, 1995 || Kitt Peak || Spacewatch || — || align=right | 1.2 km || 
|-id=693 bgcolor=#E9E9E9
| 389693 ||  || — || October 8, 2007 || Mount Lemmon || Mount Lemmon Survey || MAR || align=right | 1.2 km || 
|-id=694 bgcolor=#FFC2E0
| 389694 ||  || — || August 30, 2011 || Siding Spring || SSS || APO +1kmPHA || align=right data-sort-value="0.45" | 450 m || 
|-id=695 bgcolor=#d6d6d6
| 389695 ||  || — || March 31, 2010 || WISE || WISE || URS || align=right | 3.5 km || 
|-id=696 bgcolor=#d6d6d6
| 389696 ||  || — || February 20, 2009 || Kitt Peak || Spacewatch || EOS || align=right | 2.0 km || 
|-id=697 bgcolor=#E9E9E9
| 389697 ||  || — || April 11, 1996 || Kitt Peak || Spacewatch || — || align=right | 3.2 km || 
|-id=698 bgcolor=#E9E9E9
| 389698 ||  || — || March 6, 2006 || Kitt Peak || Spacewatch || — || align=right data-sort-value="0.82" | 820 m || 
|-id=699 bgcolor=#E9E9E9
| 389699 ||  || — || November 19, 2007 || Kitt Peak || Spacewatch || — || align=right | 2.4 km || 
|-id=700 bgcolor=#d6d6d6
| 389700 ||  || — || March 6, 2008 || Mount Lemmon || Mount Lemmon Survey || — || align=right | 3.0 km || 
|}

389701–389800 

|-bgcolor=#d6d6d6
| 389701 ||  || — || June 20, 2006 || Mount Lemmon || Mount Lemmon Survey || KOR || align=right | 1.3 km || 
|-id=702 bgcolor=#fefefe
| 389702 ||  || — || March 19, 2010 || Mount Lemmon || Mount Lemmon Survey || — || align=right | 2.3 km || 
|-id=703 bgcolor=#E9E9E9
| 389703 ||  || — || September 24, 2007 || Kitt Peak || Spacewatch || ADE || align=right | 3.4 km || 
|-id=704 bgcolor=#E9E9E9
| 389704 ||  || — || February 3, 2009 || Kitt Peak || Spacewatch || — || align=right | 2.5 km || 
|-id=705 bgcolor=#E9E9E9
| 389705 ||  || — || October 9, 2007 || Mount Lemmon || Mount Lemmon Survey || — || align=right | 1.9 km || 
|-id=706 bgcolor=#d6d6d6
| 389706 ||  || — || January 18, 2009 || Kitt Peak || Spacewatch || — || align=right | 3.9 km || 
|-id=707 bgcolor=#d6d6d6
| 389707 ||  || — || February 27, 2009 || Kitt Peak || Spacewatch || — || align=right | 2.6 km || 
|-id=708 bgcolor=#d6d6d6
| 389708 ||  || — || February 9, 2003 || Kitt Peak || Spacewatch || — || align=right | 2.8 km || 
|-id=709 bgcolor=#d6d6d6
| 389709 ||  || — || October 2, 2006 || Catalina || CSS || — || align=right | 4.2 km || 
|-id=710 bgcolor=#fefefe
| 389710 ||  || — || February 15, 2010 || Mount Lemmon || Mount Lemmon Survey || V || align=right data-sort-value="0.81" | 810 m || 
|-id=711 bgcolor=#d6d6d6
| 389711 ||  || — || June 17, 2005 || Mount Lemmon || Mount Lemmon Survey || HYG || align=right | 2.8 km || 
|-id=712 bgcolor=#d6d6d6
| 389712 ||  || — || December 31, 2007 || Mount Lemmon || Mount Lemmon Survey || VER || align=right | 2.5 km || 
|-id=713 bgcolor=#d6d6d6
| 389713 ||  || — || January 25, 2009 || Kitt Peak || Spacewatch || — || align=right | 3.0 km || 
|-id=714 bgcolor=#d6d6d6
| 389714 ||  || — || August 19, 2006 || Kitt Peak || Spacewatch || KOR || align=right | 1.3 km || 
|-id=715 bgcolor=#E9E9E9
| 389715 ||  || — || December 22, 2008 || Kitt Peak || Spacewatch || — || align=right | 1.1 km || 
|-id=716 bgcolor=#d6d6d6
| 389716 ||  || — || September 24, 2000 || Anderson Mesa || LONEOS || TIR || align=right | 3.4 km || 
|-id=717 bgcolor=#d6d6d6
| 389717 ||  || — || October 1, 2003 || Kitt Peak || Spacewatch || 3:2 || align=right | 4.6 km || 
|-id=718 bgcolor=#E9E9E9
| 389718 ||  || — || October 19, 2007 || Catalina || CSS || EUN || align=right | 1.5 km || 
|-id=719 bgcolor=#E9E9E9
| 389719 ||  || — || January 25, 2009 || Kitt Peak || Spacewatch || — || align=right | 1.6 km || 
|-id=720 bgcolor=#d6d6d6
| 389720 ||  || — || September 17, 2006 || Kitt Peak || Spacewatch || — || align=right | 2.7 km || 
|-id=721 bgcolor=#d6d6d6
| 389721 ||  || — || June 6, 2005 || Kitt Peak || Spacewatch || K-2 || align=right | 1.6 km || 
|-id=722 bgcolor=#d6d6d6
| 389722 ||  || — || September 13, 2005 || Catalina || CSS || — || align=right | 4.9 km || 
|-id=723 bgcolor=#d6d6d6
| 389723 ||  || — || September 13, 2005 || Kitt Peak || Spacewatch || — || align=right | 3.0 km || 
|-id=724 bgcolor=#d6d6d6
| 389724 ||  || — || September 30, 2005 || Kitt Peak || Spacewatch || — || align=right | 3.5 km || 
|-id=725 bgcolor=#E9E9E9
| 389725 ||  || — || November 7, 2007 || Kitt Peak || Spacewatch || MRX || align=right | 1.2 km || 
|-id=726 bgcolor=#E9E9E9
| 389726 ||  || — || April 7, 2000 || Kitt Peak || Spacewatch || — || align=right | 3.1 km || 
|-id=727 bgcolor=#d6d6d6
| 389727 ||  || — || January 30, 2009 || Mount Lemmon || Mount Lemmon Survey || — || align=right | 2.2 km || 
|-id=728 bgcolor=#d6d6d6
| 389728 ||  || — || December 10, 2004 || Campo Imperatore || CINEOS || 3:2 || align=right | 4.6 km || 
|-id=729 bgcolor=#d6d6d6
| 389729 ||  || — || March 26, 2003 || Kitt Peak || Spacewatch || — || align=right | 5.0 km || 
|-id=730 bgcolor=#E9E9E9
| 389730 ||  || — || October 17, 2003 || Kitt Peak || Spacewatch || BRG || align=right | 1.7 km || 
|-id=731 bgcolor=#d6d6d6
| 389731 ||  || — || April 25, 2003 || Kitt Peak || Spacewatch || — || align=right | 4.2 km || 
|-id=732 bgcolor=#E9E9E9
| 389732 ||  || — || October 9, 2007 || Kitt Peak || Spacewatch || NEM || align=right | 2.0 km || 
|-id=733 bgcolor=#E9E9E9
| 389733 ||  || — || March 11, 2005 || Kitt Peak || Spacewatch || AGN || align=right | 1.3 km || 
|-id=734 bgcolor=#d6d6d6
| 389734 ||  || — || March 3, 2009 || Mount Lemmon || Mount Lemmon Survey || EOS || align=right | 1.9 km || 
|-id=735 bgcolor=#d6d6d6
| 389735 ||  || — || November 10, 2006 || Kitt Peak || Spacewatch || THM || align=right | 2.6 km || 
|-id=736 bgcolor=#d6d6d6
| 389736 ||  || — || August 20, 1995 || Kitt Peak || Spacewatch || — || align=right | 4.3 km || 
|-id=737 bgcolor=#E9E9E9
| 389737 ||  || — || October 3, 2003 || Kitt Peak || Spacewatch || — || align=right | 1.6 km || 
|-id=738 bgcolor=#d6d6d6
| 389738 ||  || — || September 16, 2006 || Catalina || CSS || EOS || align=right | 2.2 km || 
|-id=739 bgcolor=#d6d6d6
| 389739 ||  || — || September 30, 2006 || Mount Lemmon || Mount Lemmon Survey || — || align=right | 3.0 km || 
|-id=740 bgcolor=#E9E9E9
| 389740 ||  || — || February 2, 2009 || Kitt Peak || Spacewatch || — || align=right | 2.7 km || 
|-id=741 bgcolor=#d6d6d6
| 389741 ||  || — || December 4, 2007 || Kitt Peak || Spacewatch || KOR || align=right | 1.5 km || 
|-id=742 bgcolor=#E9E9E9
| 389742 ||  || — || October 8, 2007 || Kitt Peak || Spacewatch || — || align=right | 3.0 km || 
|-id=743 bgcolor=#fefefe
| 389743 ||  || — || February 2, 2005 || Kitt Peak || Spacewatch || MAS || align=right data-sort-value="0.80" | 800 m || 
|-id=744 bgcolor=#d6d6d6
| 389744 ||  || — || September 30, 2006 || Mount Lemmon || Mount Lemmon Survey || — || align=right | 2.4 km || 
|-id=745 bgcolor=#E9E9E9
| 389745 ||  || — || May 10, 2006 || Mount Lemmon || Mount Lemmon Survey || — || align=right | 1.9 km || 
|-id=746 bgcolor=#d6d6d6
| 389746 ||  || — || September 17, 2006 || Kitt Peak || Spacewatch || — || align=right | 3.4 km || 
|-id=747 bgcolor=#E9E9E9
| 389747 ||  || — || September 28, 2003 || Kitt Peak || Spacewatch || — || align=right | 1.1 km || 
|-id=748 bgcolor=#d6d6d6
| 389748 ||  || — || October 2, 2006 || Mount Lemmon || Mount Lemmon Survey || EOS || align=right | 2.4 km || 
|-id=749 bgcolor=#d6d6d6
| 389749 ||  || — || September 27, 2000 || Kitt Peak || Spacewatch || — || align=right | 3.6 km || 
|-id=750 bgcolor=#d6d6d6
| 389750 ||  || — || February 22, 2009 || Kitt Peak || Spacewatch || — || align=right | 2.5 km || 
|-id=751 bgcolor=#d6d6d6
| 389751 ||  || — || February 27, 2009 || Kitt Peak || Spacewatch || — || align=right | 2.5 km || 
|-id=752 bgcolor=#d6d6d6
| 389752 ||  || — || January 18, 2008 || Kitt Peak || Spacewatch || — || align=right | 2.8 km || 
|-id=753 bgcolor=#d6d6d6
| 389753 ||  || — || April 23, 2010 || WISE || WISE || — || align=right | 3.4 km || 
|-id=754 bgcolor=#fefefe
| 389754 ||  || — || January 31, 2006 || Kitt Peak || Spacewatch || — || align=right | 2.9 km || 
|-id=755 bgcolor=#d6d6d6
| 389755 ||  || — || August 31, 2005 || Kitt Peak || Spacewatch || — || align=right | 2.9 km || 
|-id=756 bgcolor=#d6d6d6
| 389756 ||  || — || March 21, 2009 || Kitt Peak || Spacewatch || — || align=right | 3.7 km || 
|-id=757 bgcolor=#d6d6d6
| 389757 ||  || — || March 26, 2003 || Kitt Peak || Spacewatch || — || align=right | 4.4 km || 
|-id=758 bgcolor=#E9E9E9
| 389758 ||  || — || April 25, 2000 || Kitt Peak || Spacewatch || — || align=right | 2.4 km || 
|-id=759 bgcolor=#d6d6d6
| 389759 ||  || — || February 16, 2004 || Kitt Peak || Spacewatch || CHA || align=right | 2.3 km || 
|-id=760 bgcolor=#d6d6d6
| 389760 ||  || — || September 17, 2006 || Kitt Peak || Spacewatch || — || align=right | 2.3 km || 
|-id=761 bgcolor=#E9E9E9
| 389761 ||  || — || January 9, 2005 || Catalina || CSS || — || align=right | 2.1 km || 
|-id=762 bgcolor=#d6d6d6
| 389762 ||  || — || February 18, 2010 || WISE || WISE || — || align=right | 3.5 km || 
|-id=763 bgcolor=#d6d6d6
| 389763 ||  || — || November 11, 1996 || Kitt Peak || Spacewatch || — || align=right | 3.5 km || 
|-id=764 bgcolor=#d6d6d6
| 389764 ||  || — || October 1, 2000 || Socorro || LINEAR || EOS || align=right | 2.2 km || 
|-id=765 bgcolor=#d6d6d6
| 389765 ||  || — || September 8, 2011 || Kitt Peak || Spacewatch || — || align=right | 2.7 km || 
|-id=766 bgcolor=#E9E9E9
| 389766 ||  || — || March 3, 2005 || Kitt Peak || Spacewatch || HNS || align=right | 1.6 km || 
|-id=767 bgcolor=#d6d6d6
| 389767 ||  || — || February 20, 2009 || Kitt Peak || Spacewatch || — || align=right | 3.5 km || 
|-id=768 bgcolor=#E9E9E9
| 389768 ||  || — || March 18, 2001 || Socorro || LINEAR || EUN || align=right | 1.6 km || 
|-id=769 bgcolor=#fefefe
| 389769 ||  || — || July 11, 2004 || Socorro || LINEAR || — || align=right data-sort-value="0.62" | 620 m || 
|-id=770 bgcolor=#d6d6d6
| 389770 ||  || — || January 16, 2008 || Mount Lemmon || Mount Lemmon Survey || — || align=right | 2.5 km || 
|-id=771 bgcolor=#d6d6d6
| 389771 ||  || — || March 21, 1998 || Kitt Peak || Spacewatch || — || align=right | 3.0 km || 
|-id=772 bgcolor=#E9E9E9
| 389772 ||  || — || April 6, 2005 || Kitt Peak || Spacewatch || GEF || align=right | 1.2 km || 
|-id=773 bgcolor=#d6d6d6
| 389773 ||  || — || September 19, 2000 || Kitt Peak || Spacewatch || — || align=right | 2.7 km || 
|-id=774 bgcolor=#d6d6d6
| 389774 ||  || — || February 10, 2008 || Kitt Peak || Spacewatch || HYG || align=right | 2.8 km || 
|-id=775 bgcolor=#d6d6d6
| 389775 ||  || — || September 12, 1994 || Kitt Peak || Spacewatch || — || align=right | 3.5 km || 
|-id=776 bgcolor=#d6d6d6
| 389776 ||  || — || September 20, 1995 || Kitt Peak || Spacewatch || — || align=right | 2.5 km || 
|-id=777 bgcolor=#d6d6d6
| 389777 ||  || — || May 27, 2004 || Kitt Peak || Spacewatch || — || align=right | 3.5 km || 
|-id=778 bgcolor=#d6d6d6
| 389778 ||  || — || April 9, 2003 || Kitt Peak || Spacewatch || — || align=right | 3.4 km || 
|-id=779 bgcolor=#d6d6d6
| 389779 ||  || — || March 24, 2003 || Kitt Peak || Spacewatch || EOS || align=right | 2.3 km || 
|-id=780 bgcolor=#d6d6d6
| 389780 ||  || — || November 18, 2006 || Kitt Peak || Spacewatch || — || align=right | 2.7 km || 
|-id=781 bgcolor=#d6d6d6
| 389781 ||  || — || February 9, 2008 || Mount Lemmon || Mount Lemmon Survey || — || align=right | 3.5 km || 
|-id=782 bgcolor=#d6d6d6
| 389782 ||  || — || September 27, 2005 || Kitt Peak || Spacewatch || — || align=right | 3.6 km || 
|-id=783 bgcolor=#fefefe
| 389783 ||  || — || May 6, 2010 || Mount Lemmon || Mount Lemmon Survey || V || align=right data-sort-value="0.63" | 630 m || 
|-id=784 bgcolor=#d6d6d6
| 389784 ||  || — || June 15, 2010 || WISE || WISE || — || align=right | 5.6 km || 
|-id=785 bgcolor=#d6d6d6
| 389785 ||  || — || September 26, 2005 || Kitt Peak || Spacewatch || — || align=right | 3.7 km || 
|-id=786 bgcolor=#d6d6d6
| 389786 ||  || — || August 31, 2005 || Anderson Mesa || LONEOS || — || align=right | 3.0 km || 
|-id=787 bgcolor=#E9E9E9
| 389787 ||  || — || March 17, 2005 || Mount Lemmon || Mount Lemmon Survey || — || align=right | 2.7 km || 
|-id=788 bgcolor=#d6d6d6
| 389788 ||  || — || September 25, 2005 || Kitt Peak || Spacewatch || — || align=right | 5.1 km || 
|-id=789 bgcolor=#d6d6d6
| 389789 ||  || — || April 23, 2009 || Kitt Peak || Spacewatch || HYG || align=right | 3.1 km || 
|-id=790 bgcolor=#d6d6d6
| 389790 ||  || — || October 17, 2006 || Kitt Peak || Spacewatch || — || align=right | 2.4 km || 
|-id=791 bgcolor=#d6d6d6
| 389791 ||  || — || April 19, 2009 || Mount Lemmon || Mount Lemmon Survey || — || align=right | 4.1 km || 
|-id=792 bgcolor=#d6d6d6
| 389792 ||  || — || September 7, 2004 || Kitt Peak || Spacewatch || SYL7:4 || align=right | 4.2 km || 
|-id=793 bgcolor=#d6d6d6
| 389793 ||  || — || November 2, 2006 || Mount Lemmon || Mount Lemmon Survey || — || align=right | 2.2 km || 
|-id=794 bgcolor=#E9E9E9
| 389794 ||  || — || May 8, 2005 || Mount Lemmon || Mount Lemmon Survey || AGN || align=right | 1.5 km || 
|-id=795 bgcolor=#d6d6d6
| 389795 ||  || — || November 20, 2006 || Kitt Peak || Spacewatch || — || align=right | 3.0 km || 
|-id=796 bgcolor=#E9E9E9
| 389796 ||  || — || March 11, 2005 || Kitt Peak || Spacewatch || — || align=right | 3.0 km || 
|-id=797 bgcolor=#d6d6d6
| 389797 ||  || — || November 19, 2007 || Mount Lemmon || Mount Lemmon Survey || — || align=right | 4.8 km || 
|-id=798 bgcolor=#E9E9E9
| 389798 ||  || — || October 23, 2011 || Mount Lemmon || Mount Lemmon Survey || WIT || align=right | 1.2 km || 
|-id=799 bgcolor=#d6d6d6
| 389799 ||  || — || September 29, 2005 || Kitt Peak || Spacewatch || HYG || align=right | 3.3 km || 
|-id=800 bgcolor=#d6d6d6
| 389800 ||  || — || March 17, 2009 || Kitt Peak || Spacewatch || — || align=right | 3.1 km || 
|}

389801–389900 

|-bgcolor=#d6d6d6
| 389801 ||  || — || November 20, 2006 || Kitt Peak || Spacewatch || — || align=right | 3.9 km || 
|-id=802 bgcolor=#d6d6d6
| 389802 ||  || — || May 15, 2010 || WISE || WISE || LUT || align=right | 5.9 km || 
|-id=803 bgcolor=#E9E9E9
| 389803 ||  || — || November 5, 2007 || Kitt Peak || Spacewatch || — || align=right | 2.1 km || 
|-id=804 bgcolor=#d6d6d6
| 389804 ||  || — || March 19, 2009 || Kitt Peak || Spacewatch || — || align=right | 3.2 km || 
|-id=805 bgcolor=#fefefe
| 389805 ||  || — || April 11, 2010 || Kitt Peak || Spacewatch || — || align=right data-sort-value="0.66" | 660 m || 
|-id=806 bgcolor=#d6d6d6
| 389806 ||  || — || August 27, 2005 || Kitt Peak || Spacewatch || EMA || align=right | 2.7 km || 
|-id=807 bgcolor=#d6d6d6
| 389807 ||  || — || September 27, 2006 || Kitt Peak || Spacewatch || — || align=right | 2.5 km || 
|-id=808 bgcolor=#E9E9E9
| 389808 ||  || — || March 31, 2005 || Anderson Mesa || LONEOS || — || align=right | 2.7 km || 
|-id=809 bgcolor=#d6d6d6
| 389809 ||  || — || March 19, 2009 || Kitt Peak || Spacewatch || — || align=right | 3.9 km || 
|-id=810 bgcolor=#C2FFFF
| 389810 ||  || — || October 31, 2011 || Mount Lemmon || Mount Lemmon Survey || L4 || align=right | 10 km || 
|-id=811 bgcolor=#d6d6d6
| 389811 ||  || — || March 14, 2004 || Kitt Peak || Spacewatch || KOR || align=right | 1.8 km || 
|-id=812 bgcolor=#d6d6d6
| 389812 ||  || — || August 6, 2005 || Siding Spring || SSS || — || align=right | 3.6 km || 
|-id=813 bgcolor=#d6d6d6
| 389813 ||  || — || November 15, 2006 || Kitt Peak || Spacewatch || — || align=right | 2.7 km || 
|-id=814 bgcolor=#d6d6d6
| 389814 ||  || — || October 28, 2006 || Kitt Peak || Spacewatch || EOS || align=right | 2.6 km || 
|-id=815 bgcolor=#fefefe
| 389815 ||  || — || October 1, 2000 || Socorro || LINEAR || — || align=right | 1.2 km || 
|-id=816 bgcolor=#d6d6d6
| 389816 ||  || — || April 28, 2009 || Mount Lemmon || Mount Lemmon Survey || VER || align=right | 3.5 km || 
|-id=817 bgcolor=#d6d6d6
| 389817 ||  || — || March 24, 2003 || Kitt Peak || Spacewatch || — || align=right | 4.1 km || 
|-id=818 bgcolor=#d6d6d6
| 389818 ||  || — || April 26, 2003 || Kitt Peak || Spacewatch || URS || align=right | 3.5 km || 
|-id=819 bgcolor=#E9E9E9
| 389819 ||  || — || February 5, 2009 || Kitt Peak || Spacewatch || — || align=right | 1.6 km || 
|-id=820 bgcolor=#C7FF8F
| 389820 ||  || — || October 12, 2010 || Mount Lemmon || Mount Lemmon Survey || centaur || align=right | 12 km || 
|-id=821 bgcolor=#d6d6d6
| 389821 ||  || — || August 30, 2005 || Kitt Peak || Spacewatch || EOS || align=right | 2.1 km || 
|-id=822 bgcolor=#C2FFFF
| 389822 ||  || — || October 17, 2010 || Mount Lemmon || Mount Lemmon Survey || L4 || align=right | 7.5 km || 
|-id=823 bgcolor=#C2FFFF
| 389823 ||  || — || December 25, 2011 || Kitt Peak || Spacewatch || L4ERY || align=right | 9.3 km || 
|-id=824 bgcolor=#C2FFFF
| 389824 ||  || — || December 27, 2011 || Mount Lemmon || Mount Lemmon Survey || L4ERY || align=right | 8.9 km || 
|-id=825 bgcolor=#C2FFFF
| 389825 ||  || — || September 3, 2008 || Kitt Peak || Spacewatch || L4 || align=right | 7.8 km || 
|-id=826 bgcolor=#C2FFFF
| 389826 ||  || — || January 19, 2001 || Kitt Peak || Spacewatch || L4 || align=right | 10 km || 
|-id=827 bgcolor=#C2FFFF
| 389827 ||  || — || September 7, 2008 || Mount Lemmon || Mount Lemmon Survey || L4 || align=right | 8.9 km || 
|-id=828 bgcolor=#fefefe
| 389828 ||  || — || April 11, 2005 || Mount Lemmon || Mount Lemmon Survey || — || align=right | 1.1 km || 
|-id=829 bgcolor=#fefefe
| 389829 ||  || — || March 4, 2005 || Mount Lemmon || Mount Lemmon Survey || NYS || align=right data-sort-value="0.60" | 600 m || 
|-id=830 bgcolor=#E9E9E9
| 389830 ||  || — || January 28, 2003 || Kitt Peak || Spacewatch || — || align=right | 2.9 km || 
|-id=831 bgcolor=#d6d6d6
| 389831 ||  || — || March 10, 2007 || Kitt Peak || Spacewatch || — || align=right | 2.7 km || 
|-id=832 bgcolor=#d6d6d6
| 389832 ||  || — || February 4, 2000 || Kitt Peak || Spacewatch || — || align=right | 3.2 km || 
|-id=833 bgcolor=#fefefe
| 389833 ||  || — || December 29, 2005 || Catalina || CSS || H || align=right data-sort-value="0.72" | 720 m || 
|-id=834 bgcolor=#E9E9E9
| 389834 ||  || — || December 7, 2005 || Kitt Peak || Spacewatch || — || align=right | 1.6 km || 
|-id=835 bgcolor=#fefefe
| 389835 ||  || — || October 21, 2009 || Mount Lemmon || Mount Lemmon Survey || — || align=right data-sort-value="0.79" | 790 m || 
|-id=836 bgcolor=#fefefe
| 389836 ||  || — || November 14, 2007 || Socorro || LINEAR || H || align=right data-sort-value="0.72" | 720 m || 
|-id=837 bgcolor=#fefefe
| 389837 ||  || — || January 27, 2007 || Kitt Peak || Spacewatch || V || align=right data-sort-value="0.62" | 620 m || 
|-id=838 bgcolor=#fefefe
| 389838 ||  || — || March 29, 2008 || Kitt Peak || Spacewatch || FLO || align=right data-sort-value="0.52" | 520 m || 
|-id=839 bgcolor=#fefefe
| 389839 ||  || — || August 23, 2004 || Kitt Peak || Spacewatch || H || align=right data-sort-value="0.54" | 540 m || 
|-id=840 bgcolor=#fefefe
| 389840 ||  || — || January 27, 2007 || Kitt Peak || Spacewatch || — || align=right data-sort-value="0.86" | 860 m || 
|-id=841 bgcolor=#E9E9E9
| 389841 ||  || — || September 30, 2008 || Catalina || CSS || — || align=right | 1.0 km || 
|-id=842 bgcolor=#E9E9E9
| 389842 ||  || — || October 1, 2008 || Mount Lemmon || Mount Lemmon Survey || — || align=right | 2.0 km || 
|-id=843 bgcolor=#E9E9E9
| 389843 ||  || — || February 5, 2000 || Kitt Peak || Spacewatch || WAT || align=right | 1.9 km || 
|-id=844 bgcolor=#fefefe
| 389844 ||  || — || February 17, 2001 || Kitt Peak || Spacewatch || — || align=right data-sort-value="0.75" | 750 m || 
|-id=845 bgcolor=#fefefe
| 389845 ||  || — || September 23, 2008 || Mount Lemmon || Mount Lemmon Survey || LCI || align=right | 1.0 km || 
|-id=846 bgcolor=#fefefe
| 389846 ||  || — || December 7, 2005 || Kitt Peak || Spacewatch || — || align=right data-sort-value="0.86" | 860 m || 
|-id=847 bgcolor=#fefefe
| 389847 ||  || — || December 17, 2009 || Kitt Peak || Spacewatch || V || align=right data-sort-value="0.75" | 750 m || 
|-id=848 bgcolor=#E9E9E9
| 389848 ||  || — || March 20, 2010 || Mount Lemmon || Mount Lemmon Survey || — || align=right | 2.5 km || 
|-id=849 bgcolor=#fefefe
| 389849 ||  || — || November 19, 2001 || Socorro || LINEAR || — || align=right data-sort-value="0.98" | 980 m || 
|-id=850 bgcolor=#fefefe
| 389850 ||  || — || November 12, 2006 || Mount Lemmon || Mount Lemmon Survey || — || align=right | 1.0 km || 
|-id=851 bgcolor=#E9E9E9
| 389851 ||  || — || October 24, 1998 || Kitt Peak || Spacewatch || — || align=right | 1.8 km || 
|-id=852 bgcolor=#E9E9E9
| 389852 ||  || — || March 13, 2010 || Mount Lemmon || Mount Lemmon Survey || — || align=right | 1.7 km || 
|-id=853 bgcolor=#fefefe
| 389853 ||  || — || September 19, 2001 || Socorro || LINEAR || V || align=right data-sort-value="0.73" | 730 m || 
|-id=854 bgcolor=#fefefe
| 389854 ||  || — || January 12, 2010 || Catalina || CSS || — || align=right | 1.3 km || 
|-id=855 bgcolor=#fefefe
| 389855 ||  || — || December 30, 2005 || Mount Lemmon || Mount Lemmon Survey || NYS || align=right data-sort-value="0.72" | 720 m || 
|-id=856 bgcolor=#E9E9E9
| 389856 ||  || — || November 18, 2004 || Siding Spring || SSS || — || align=right data-sort-value="0.99" | 990 m || 
|-id=857 bgcolor=#E9E9E9
| 389857 ||  || — || September 13, 1998 || Kitt Peak || Spacewatch || INO || align=right | 1.3 km || 
|-id=858 bgcolor=#E9E9E9
| 389858 ||  || — || December 18, 2004 || Mount Lemmon || Mount Lemmon Survey || — || align=right | 1.5 km || 
|-id=859 bgcolor=#E9E9E9
| 389859 ||  || — || September 28, 2003 || Kitt Peak || Spacewatch || — || align=right | 2.0 km || 
|-id=860 bgcolor=#E9E9E9
| 389860 ||  || — || October 24, 2008 || Kitt Peak || Spacewatch || — || align=right | 1.5 km || 
|-id=861 bgcolor=#fefefe
| 389861 ||  || — || December 26, 2005 || Kitt Peak || Spacewatch || — || align=right | 1.0 km || 
|-id=862 bgcolor=#fefefe
| 389862 ||  || — || November 11, 2009 || Kitt Peak || Spacewatch || FLO || align=right data-sort-value="0.65" | 650 m || 
|-id=863 bgcolor=#E9E9E9
| 389863 ||  || — || October 2, 1999 || Kitt Peak || Spacewatch || ADE || align=right | 2.2 km || 
|-id=864 bgcolor=#E9E9E9
| 389864 ||  || — || November 1, 2008 || Catalina || CSS || — || align=right | 2.1 km || 
|-id=865 bgcolor=#fefefe
| 389865 ||  || — || November 23, 2009 || Mount Lemmon || Mount Lemmon Survey || FLO || align=right data-sort-value="0.62" | 620 m || 
|-id=866 bgcolor=#E9E9E9
| 389866 ||  || — || December 21, 2008 || Catalina || CSS || — || align=right | 1.7 km || 
|-id=867 bgcolor=#E9E9E9
| 389867 ||  || — || January 13, 2005 || Catalina || CSS || — || align=right | 1.9 km || 
|-id=868 bgcolor=#E9E9E9
| 389868 ||  || — || September 30, 2003 || Kitt Peak || Spacewatch || — || align=right | 2.2 km || 
|-id=869 bgcolor=#E9E9E9
| 389869 ||  || — || August 9, 2007 || Kitt Peak || Spacewatch || — || align=right | 2.4 km || 
|-id=870 bgcolor=#fefefe
| 389870 ||  || — || October 21, 2007 || Mount Lemmon || Mount Lemmon Survey || H || align=right data-sort-value="0.65" | 650 m || 
|-id=871 bgcolor=#fefefe
| 389871 ||  || — || April 4, 1995 || Kitt Peak || Spacewatch || — || align=right data-sort-value="0.80" | 800 m || 
|-id=872 bgcolor=#fefefe
| 389872 ||  || — || December 18, 2003 || Kitt Peak || Spacewatch || — || align=right data-sort-value="0.67" | 670 m || 
|-id=873 bgcolor=#fefefe
| 389873 ||  || — || July 29, 2008 || Kitt Peak || Spacewatch || — || align=right data-sort-value="0.87" | 870 m || 
|-id=874 bgcolor=#E9E9E9
| 389874 ||  || — || October 27, 2008 || Kitt Peak || Spacewatch || RAF || align=right | 1.1 km || 
|-id=875 bgcolor=#d6d6d6
| 389875 ||  || — || September 23, 2001 || Socorro || LINEAR || — || align=right | 3.6 km || 
|-id=876 bgcolor=#fefefe
| 389876 ||  || — || September 28, 1997 || Kitt Peak || Spacewatch || — || align=right data-sort-value="0.90" | 900 m || 
|-id=877 bgcolor=#fefefe
| 389877 ||  || — || November 20, 2001 || Socorro || LINEAR || — || align=right data-sort-value="0.91" | 910 m || 
|-id=878 bgcolor=#fefefe
| 389878 ||  || — || August 28, 2005 || Kitt Peak || Spacewatch || V || align=right data-sort-value="0.56" | 560 m || 
|-id=879 bgcolor=#fefefe
| 389879 ||  || — || April 23, 1998 || Kitt Peak || Spacewatch || — || align=right data-sort-value="0.85" | 850 m || 
|-id=880 bgcolor=#E9E9E9
| 389880 ||  || — || October 3, 1999 || Kitt Peak || Spacewatch || ADE || align=right | 2.8 km || 
|-id=881 bgcolor=#E9E9E9
| 389881 ||  || — || October 29, 2003 || Kitt Peak || Spacewatch || GEF || align=right | 1.2 km || 
|-id=882 bgcolor=#E9E9E9
| 389882 ||  || — || October 27, 2008 || Mount Lemmon || Mount Lemmon Survey || EUN || align=right | 1.1 km || 
|-id=883 bgcolor=#d6d6d6
| 389883 ||  || — || March 3, 2009 || Kitt Peak || Spacewatch || — || align=right | 3.4 km || 
|-id=884 bgcolor=#E9E9E9
| 389884 ||  || — || October 28, 2008 || Mount Lemmon || Mount Lemmon Survey || — || align=right | 1.5 km || 
|-id=885 bgcolor=#fefefe
| 389885 ||  || — || September 26, 1998 || Socorro || LINEAR || FLO || align=right data-sort-value="0.84" | 840 m || 
|-id=886 bgcolor=#d6d6d6
| 389886 ||  || — || August 23, 2001 || Anderson Mesa || LONEOS || HYG || align=right | 3.3 km || 
|-id=887 bgcolor=#E9E9E9
| 389887 ||  || — || October 2, 2003 || Kitt Peak || Spacewatch || — || align=right | 2.2 km || 
|-id=888 bgcolor=#fefefe
| 389888 ||  || — || October 23, 2009 || Mount Lemmon || Mount Lemmon Survey || — || align=right data-sort-value="0.58" | 580 m || 
|-id=889 bgcolor=#C2FFFF
| 389889 ||  || — || March 25, 2007 || Mount Lemmon || Mount Lemmon Survey || L5 || align=right | 13 km || 
|-id=890 bgcolor=#E9E9E9
| 389890 ||  || — || January 18, 2005 || Catalina || CSS || — || align=right | 2.1 km || 
|-id=891 bgcolor=#fefefe
| 389891 ||  || — || October 15, 1995 || Kitt Peak || Spacewatch || NYS || align=right data-sort-value="0.64" | 640 m || 
|-id=892 bgcolor=#E9E9E9
| 389892 ||  || — || December 30, 2008 || Kitt Peak || Spacewatch || XIZ || align=right | 1.5 km || 
|-id=893 bgcolor=#E9E9E9
| 389893 ||  || — || May 2, 2006 || Mount Lemmon || Mount Lemmon Survey || — || align=right | 2.7 km || 
|-id=894 bgcolor=#fefefe
| 389894 ||  || — || October 14, 2001 || Socorro || LINEAR || — || align=right data-sort-value="0.79" | 790 m || 
|-id=895 bgcolor=#FA8072
| 389895 ||  || — || March 1, 2008 || Kitt Peak || Spacewatch || — || align=right data-sort-value="0.70" | 700 m || 
|-id=896 bgcolor=#d6d6d6
| 389896 ||  || — || February 20, 2009 || Kitt Peak || Spacewatch || — || align=right | 2.9 km || 
|-id=897 bgcolor=#fefefe
| 389897 ||  || — || April 29, 2008 || Kitt Peak || Spacewatch || — || align=right data-sort-value="0.83" | 830 m || 
|-id=898 bgcolor=#fefefe
| 389898 ||  || — || October 27, 2005 || Kitt Peak || Spacewatch || V || align=right data-sort-value="0.58" | 580 m || 
|-id=899 bgcolor=#fefefe
| 389899 ||  || — || April 13, 2004 || Kitt Peak || Spacewatch || — || align=right data-sort-value="0.80" | 800 m || 
|-id=900 bgcolor=#E9E9E9
| 389900 ||  || — || April 13, 2001 || Kitt Peak || Spacewatch || — || align=right | 2.3 km || 
|}

389901–390000 

|-bgcolor=#d6d6d6
| 389901 ||  || — || November 9, 2007 || Mount Lemmon || Mount Lemmon Survey || — || align=right | 2.4 km || 
|-id=902 bgcolor=#d6d6d6
| 389902 ||  || — || November 2, 2007 || Mount Lemmon || Mount Lemmon Survey || — || align=right | 2.9 km || 
|-id=903 bgcolor=#fefefe
| 389903 ||  || — || August 7, 2008 || Kitt Peak || Spacewatch || V || align=right data-sort-value="0.70" | 700 m || 
|-id=904 bgcolor=#fefefe
| 389904 ||  || — || November 14, 2006 || Mount Lemmon || Mount Lemmon Survey || FLO || align=right data-sort-value="0.68" | 680 m || 
|-id=905 bgcolor=#E9E9E9
| 389905 ||  || — || December 22, 2008 || Mount Lemmon || Mount Lemmon Survey || WIT || align=right | 1.3 km || 
|-id=906 bgcolor=#E9E9E9
| 389906 ||  || — || December 13, 2004 || Kitt Peak || Spacewatch || — || align=right | 1.9 km || 
|-id=907 bgcolor=#E9E9E9
| 389907 ||  || — || October 21, 2008 || Kitt Peak || Spacewatch || — || align=right | 1.2 km || 
|-id=908 bgcolor=#d6d6d6
| 389908 ||  || — || August 27, 2006 || Kitt Peak || Spacewatch || HYG || align=right | 3.1 km || 
|-id=909 bgcolor=#d6d6d6
| 389909 ||  || — || March 8, 2009 || Mount Lemmon || Mount Lemmon Survey || — || align=right | 4.1 km || 
|-id=910 bgcolor=#fefefe
| 389910 ||  || — || November 25, 2005 || Mount Lemmon || Mount Lemmon Survey || — || align=right data-sort-value="0.82" | 820 m || 
|-id=911 bgcolor=#fefefe
| 389911 ||  || — || March 10, 2011 || Kitt Peak || Spacewatch || FLO || align=right data-sort-value="0.66" | 660 m || 
|-id=912 bgcolor=#E9E9E9
| 389912 ||  || — || October 6, 1999 || Socorro || LINEAR || — || align=right | 1.5 km || 
|-id=913 bgcolor=#E9E9E9
| 389913 ||  || — || July 31, 2008 || Mount Lemmon || Mount Lemmon Survey || — || align=right | 1.1 km || 
|-id=914 bgcolor=#fefefe
| 389914 ||  || — || November 20, 2001 || Socorro || LINEAR || — || align=right data-sort-value="0.91" | 910 m || 
|-id=915 bgcolor=#fefefe
| 389915 ||  || — || March 23, 2003 || Kitt Peak || Spacewatch || V || align=right data-sort-value="0.82" | 820 m || 
|-id=916 bgcolor=#E9E9E9
| 389916 ||  || — || October 23, 2003 || Kitt Peak || Spacewatch || — || align=right | 2.0 km || 
|-id=917 bgcolor=#fefefe
| 389917 ||  || — || November 21, 2009 || Mount Lemmon || Mount Lemmon Survey || MAS || align=right data-sort-value="0.80" | 800 m || 
|-id=918 bgcolor=#fefefe
| 389918 ||  || — || January 23, 2006 || Kitt Peak || Spacewatch || — || align=right data-sort-value="0.95" | 950 m || 
|-id=919 bgcolor=#E9E9E9
| 389919 ||  || — || September 18, 2003 || Kitt Peak || Spacewatch || — || align=right | 1.6 km || 
|-id=920 bgcolor=#d6d6d6
| 389920 ||  || — || October 7, 1996 || Kitt Peak || Spacewatch || — || align=right | 2.8 km || 
|-id=921 bgcolor=#fefefe
| 389921 ||  || — || December 26, 2005 || Kitt Peak || Spacewatch || NYS || align=right data-sort-value="0.69" | 690 m || 
|-id=922 bgcolor=#E9E9E9
| 389922 ||  || — || April 5, 2010 || Kitt Peak || Spacewatch || — || align=right | 1.7 km || 
|-id=923 bgcolor=#d6d6d6
| 389923 ||  || — || August 21, 2006 || Kitt Peak || Spacewatch || HYG || align=right | 2.3 km || 
|-id=924 bgcolor=#d6d6d6
| 389924 ||  || — || January 31, 2009 || Kitt Peak || Spacewatch || — || align=right | 2.9 km || 
|-id=925 bgcolor=#fefefe
| 389925 ||  || — || March 20, 2007 || Anderson Mesa || LONEOS || — || align=right | 1.1 km || 
|-id=926 bgcolor=#E9E9E9
| 389926 ||  || — || January 1, 2009 || Kitt Peak || Spacewatch || — || align=right | 2.3 km || 
|-id=927 bgcolor=#E9E9E9
| 389927 ||  || — || December 11, 2004 || Catalina || CSS || EUN || align=right | 1.7 km || 
|-id=928 bgcolor=#fefefe
| 389928 ||  || — || December 18, 1999 || Kitt Peak || Spacewatch || — || align=right data-sort-value="0.86" | 860 m || 
|-id=929 bgcolor=#E9E9E9
| 389929 ||  || — || October 21, 2008 || Kitt Peak || Spacewatch || — || align=right data-sort-value="0.99" | 990 m || 
|-id=930 bgcolor=#E9E9E9
| 389930 ||  || — || October 27, 2008 || Mount Lemmon || Mount Lemmon Survey || — || align=right | 1.4 km || 
|-id=931 bgcolor=#fefefe
| 389931 ||  || — || December 14, 2001 || Socorro || LINEAR || NYS || align=right data-sort-value="0.93" | 930 m || 
|-id=932 bgcolor=#E9E9E9
| 389932 ||  || — || October 1, 1998 || Kitt Peak || Spacewatch || — || align=right | 2.5 km || 
|-id=933 bgcolor=#d6d6d6
| 389933 ||  || — || October 8, 2012 || Kitt Peak || Spacewatch || — || align=right | 3.9 km || 
|-id=934 bgcolor=#E9E9E9
| 389934 ||  || — || September 21, 2003 || Kitt Peak || Spacewatch || NEM || align=right | 2.3 km || 
|-id=935 bgcolor=#E9E9E9
| 389935 ||  || — || March 12, 2010 || Catalina || CSS || — || align=right | 1.8 km || 
|-id=936 bgcolor=#E9E9E9
| 389936 ||  || — || November 18, 2008 || Kitt Peak || Spacewatch || — || align=right | 1.5 km || 
|-id=937 bgcolor=#fefefe
| 389937 ||  || — || October 23, 1995 || Kitt Peak || Spacewatch || — || align=right | 1.1 km || 
|-id=938 bgcolor=#E9E9E9
| 389938 ||  || — || October 15, 1995 || Kitt Peak || Spacewatch || — || align=right | 1.3 km || 
|-id=939 bgcolor=#fefefe
| 389939 ||  || — || April 25, 2004 || Kitt Peak || Spacewatch || — || align=right data-sort-value="0.93" | 930 m || 
|-id=940 bgcolor=#fefefe
| 389940 ||  || — || December 28, 2005 || Kitt Peak || Spacewatch || — || align=right data-sort-value="0.72" | 720 m || 
|-id=941 bgcolor=#d6d6d6
| 389941 ||  || — || September 16, 2006 || Kitt Peak || Spacewatch || — || align=right | 2.3 km || 
|-id=942 bgcolor=#E9E9E9
| 389942 ||  || — || December 17, 2003 || Kitt Peak || Spacewatch || — || align=right | 2.1 km || 
|-id=943 bgcolor=#E9E9E9
| 389943 ||  || — || October 29, 2008 || Mount Lemmon || Mount Lemmon Survey || HEN || align=right data-sort-value="0.92" | 920 m || 
|-id=944 bgcolor=#E9E9E9
| 389944 ||  || — || May 23, 2006 || Kitt Peak || Spacewatch || — || align=right | 1.9 km || 
|-id=945 bgcolor=#fefefe
| 389945 ||  || — || September 7, 2008 || Mount Lemmon || Mount Lemmon Survey || — || align=right data-sort-value="0.82" | 820 m || 
|-id=946 bgcolor=#E9E9E9
| 389946 ||  || — || March 23, 2006 || Kitt Peak || Spacewatch || KON || align=right | 2.3 km || 
|-id=947 bgcolor=#E9E9E9
| 389947 ||  || — || October 22, 2008 || Kitt Peak || Spacewatch || — || align=right | 1.4 km || 
|-id=948 bgcolor=#E9E9E9
| 389948 ||  || — || September 28, 2003 || Kitt Peak || Spacewatch || HEN || align=right | 1.0 km || 
|-id=949 bgcolor=#d6d6d6
| 389949 ||  || — || October 2, 1997 || Caussols || ODAS || — || align=right | 3.0 km || 
|-id=950 bgcolor=#E9E9E9
| 389950 ||  || — || April 8, 2010 || Kitt Peak || Spacewatch || RAF || align=right | 1.0 km || 
|-id=951 bgcolor=#E9E9E9
| 389951 ||  || — || December 31, 2008 || Mount Lemmon || Mount Lemmon Survey || WIT || align=right | 1.5 km || 
|-id=952 bgcolor=#fefefe
| 389952 ||  || — || September 21, 2001 || Socorro || LINEAR || V || align=right data-sort-value="0.73" | 730 m || 
|-id=953 bgcolor=#fefefe
| 389953 ||  || — || January 26, 2007 || Kitt Peak || Spacewatch || FLO || align=right data-sort-value="0.61" | 610 m || 
|-id=954 bgcolor=#d6d6d6
| 389954 ||  || — || November 24, 2008 || Mount Lemmon || Mount Lemmon Survey || CHA || align=right | 2.1 km || 
|-id=955 bgcolor=#E9E9E9
| 389955 ||  || — || October 19, 2003 || Kitt Peak || Spacewatch || — || align=right | 2.1 km || 
|-id=956 bgcolor=#fefefe
| 389956 ||  || — || October 1, 2005 || Kitt Peak || Spacewatch || — || align=right data-sort-value="0.98" | 980 m || 
|-id=957 bgcolor=#E9E9E9
| 389957 ||  || — || October 25, 2008 || Catalina || CSS || — || align=right | 1.4 km || 
|-id=958 bgcolor=#fefefe
| 389958 ||  || — || November 21, 2005 || Kitt Peak || Spacewatch || — || align=right data-sort-value="0.88" | 880 m || 
|-id=959 bgcolor=#d6d6d6
| 389959 ||  || — || December 5, 2007 || Kitt Peak || Spacewatch || — || align=right | 2.5 km || 
|-id=960 bgcolor=#fefefe
| 389960 ||  || — || March 28, 2011 || Kitt Peak || Spacewatch || — || align=right data-sort-value="0.86" | 860 m || 
|-id=961 bgcolor=#fefefe
| 389961 ||  || — || March 25, 2003 || Anderson Mesa || LONEOS || V || align=right data-sort-value="0.65" | 650 m || 
|-id=962 bgcolor=#E9E9E9
| 389962 ||  || — || October 3, 1999 || Socorro || LINEAR || EUN || align=right | 1.4 km || 
|-id=963 bgcolor=#d6d6d6
| 389963 ||  || — || October 12, 2007 || Mount Lemmon || Mount Lemmon Survey || — || align=right | 4.0 km || 
|-id=964 bgcolor=#d6d6d6
| 389964 ||  || — || February 28, 2009 || Kitt Peak || Spacewatch || — || align=right | 2.4 km || 
|-id=965 bgcolor=#E9E9E9
| 389965 ||  || — || October 1, 2003 || Kitt Peak || Spacewatch || — || align=right | 2.2 km || 
|-id=966 bgcolor=#fefefe
| 389966 ||  || — || December 28, 2005 || Catalina || CSS || fast? || align=right | 1.1 km || 
|-id=967 bgcolor=#fefefe
| 389967 ||  || — || September 11, 2004 || Kitt Peak || Spacewatch || V || align=right data-sort-value="0.77" | 770 m || 
|-id=968 bgcolor=#fefefe
| 389968 ||  || — || September 7, 2008 || Mount Lemmon || Mount Lemmon Survey || V || align=right data-sort-value="0.68" | 680 m || 
|-id=969 bgcolor=#E9E9E9
| 389969 ||  || — || March 24, 2006 || Mount Lemmon || Mount Lemmon Survey || ADE || align=right | 2.5 km || 
|-id=970 bgcolor=#d6d6d6
| 389970 ||  || — || November 19, 2007 || Kitt Peak || Spacewatch || LIX || align=right | 4.1 km || 
|-id=971 bgcolor=#d6d6d6
| 389971 ||  || — || August 29, 2006 || Kitt Peak || Spacewatch || — || align=right | 3.4 km || 
|-id=972 bgcolor=#fefefe
| 389972 ||  || — || March 26, 2008 || Mount Lemmon || Mount Lemmon Survey || — || align=right data-sort-value="0.69" | 690 m || 
|-id=973 bgcolor=#fefefe
| 389973 ||  || — || September 6, 2008 || Mount Lemmon || Mount Lemmon Survey || — || align=right data-sort-value="0.78" | 780 m || 
|-id=974 bgcolor=#fefefe
| 389974 ||  || — || September 7, 2008 || Mount Lemmon || Mount Lemmon Survey || — || align=right data-sort-value="0.79" | 790 m || 
|-id=975 bgcolor=#fefefe
| 389975 ||  || — || December 5, 2002 || Kitt Peak || Spacewatch || FLO || align=right data-sort-value="0.72" | 720 m || 
|-id=976 bgcolor=#d6d6d6
| 389976 ||  || — || May 8, 2005 || Mount Lemmon || Mount Lemmon Survey || TEL || align=right | 1.4 km || 
|-id=977 bgcolor=#E9E9E9
| 389977 ||  || — || September 27, 2008 || Mount Lemmon || Mount Lemmon Survey || — || align=right | 1.1 km || 
|-id=978 bgcolor=#fefefe
| 389978 ||  || — || February 9, 2007 || Kitt Peak || Spacewatch || — || align=right data-sort-value="0.69" | 690 m || 
|-id=979 bgcolor=#fefefe
| 389979 ||  || — || December 2, 2005 || Kitt Peak || Spacewatch || V || align=right data-sort-value="0.77" | 770 m || 
|-id=980 bgcolor=#d6d6d6
| 389980 ||  || — || September 17, 2006 || Kitt Peak || Spacewatch || EOS || align=right | 2.1 km || 
|-id=981 bgcolor=#E9E9E9
| 389981 ||  || — || September 20, 2003 || Campo Imperatore || CINEOS || EUN || align=right | 1.4 km || 
|-id=982 bgcolor=#d6d6d6
| 389982 ||  || — || September 26, 2006 || Catalina || CSS || — || align=right | 4.0 km || 
|-id=983 bgcolor=#E9E9E9
| 389983 ||  || — || October 2, 2003 || Kitt Peak || Spacewatch || — || align=right | 2.0 km || 
|-id=984 bgcolor=#E9E9E9
| 389984 ||  || — || November 24, 2003 || Kitt Peak || Spacewatch || HOF || align=right | 2.4 km || 
|-id=985 bgcolor=#fefefe
| 389985 ||  || — || March 11, 2011 || Kitt Peak || Spacewatch || FLO || align=right data-sort-value="0.50" | 500 m || 
|-id=986 bgcolor=#E9E9E9
| 389986 ||  || — || December 12, 2004 || Kitt Peak || Spacewatch || AER || align=right | 1.4 km || 
|-id=987 bgcolor=#fefefe
| 389987 ||  || — || November 2, 2005 || Mount Lemmon || Mount Lemmon Survey || FLO || align=right data-sort-value="0.67" | 670 m || 
|-id=988 bgcolor=#E9E9E9
| 389988 ||  || — || October 6, 1999 || Socorro || LINEAR || — || align=right | 1.6 km || 
|-id=989 bgcolor=#d6d6d6
| 389989 ||  || — || April 6, 2005 || Mount Lemmon || Mount Lemmon Survey || — || align=right | 2.7 km || 
|-id=990 bgcolor=#fefefe
| 389990 ||  || — || October 1, 1999 || Catalina || CSS || — || align=right | 1.0 km || 
|-id=991 bgcolor=#d6d6d6
| 389991 ||  || — || November 7, 2007 || Kitt Peak || Spacewatch || — || align=right | 3.1 km || 
|-id=992 bgcolor=#E9E9E9
| 389992 ||  || — || February 27, 2006 || Kitt Peak || Spacewatch || — || align=right data-sort-value="0.95" | 950 m || 
|-id=993 bgcolor=#d6d6d6
| 389993 ||  || — || April 21, 2009 || Mount Lemmon || Mount Lemmon Survey || — || align=right | 2.4 km || 
|-id=994 bgcolor=#E9E9E9
| 389994 ||  || — || September 21, 2003 || Kitt Peak || Spacewatch || — || align=right | 1.4 km || 
|-id=995 bgcolor=#E9E9E9
| 389995 ||  || — || January 24, 1996 || Kitt Peak || Spacewatch || WIT || align=right | 1.1 km || 
|-id=996 bgcolor=#fefefe
| 389996 ||  || — || March 21, 2001 || Kitt Peak || Spacewatch || — || align=right data-sort-value="0.98" | 980 m || 
|-id=997 bgcolor=#E9E9E9
| 389997 ||  || — || August 24, 2007 || Kitt Peak || Spacewatch || HEN || align=right | 1.0 km || 
|-id=998 bgcolor=#E9E9E9
| 389998 ||  || — || April 19, 2006 || Mount Lemmon || Mount Lemmon Survey || — || align=right | 1.1 km || 
|-id=999 bgcolor=#fefefe
| 389999 ||  || — || September 19, 2001 || Socorro || LINEAR || V || align=right data-sort-value="0.63" | 630 m || 
|-id=000 bgcolor=#E9E9E9
| 390000 ||  || — || September 13, 2007 || Mount Lemmon || Mount Lemmon Survey || — || align=right | 1.4 km || 
|}

References

External links 
 Discovery Circumstances: Numbered Minor Planets (385001)–(390000) (IAU Minor Planet Center)

0389